= Chief of Staff of the French Navy =

- Chef d'État-Major de la Marine (fr)
- Marque of the Chief

- Incumbent; Amiral Nicolas Vaujour since 1 September 2023
- Ministry of the Armed Forces
- Style: Monsieur le Chef d'État-Major de la Marine
- Abbreviation: C.E.M.M.
- Member of: Chiefs of Staff Committee
- Reports to: Chief of the Defence Staff
- Seat: Hexagone Balard, Paris
- Appointer: President of the Republic; Requires the Prime Minister's countersignature
- Formation: 1871
- First holder: Jules Krantz
- Deputy: Major General of the Navy
- Website: www.defense.gouv.fr

The Chief of the Naval Staff (French: Chef d’état-major de la Marine, pronounced [ʃɛf deta maʒɔʁ də la maʁin], abbr. CEMM) is a French general officer, adviser to the Chief of the Defence Staff for the French Navy and responsible to the Minister of the Armed Forces for preparing the Navy for its engagement. Since 1 September 2023, the Chief of the Naval Staff has been Admiral Nicolas Vaujour.

== Main powers ==
The Chief of the Naval Staff is the top representative of the French Navy.

He advises and assists the Chief of the Defence Staff. He provides him with Navy-specific expertise.

He maintains bilateral relations with foreign navies. He participates in inter-administrative bodies in the field of State action at sea.

He has authority over the Navy General Staff (French: Etat-major de la Marine, acronym: EMM), over the Navy Military Personnel Directorate (French: Direction du personnel militaire de la Marine, acronym: DPMM), as well as over all the commands, directorates and services that make up the French Navy.

He ensures the preparation of the naval forces. As such, he is responsible for instruction and training, as well as maintenance of operational readiness. He develops the concepts and doctrines for the employment of naval forces. He reports to the Chief of the Defence Staff on the availability of assets and the operational readiness of the naval forces.

Regarding capabilities, the Chief of the Naval Staff develops the French Navy's military requirements. He defines support and infrastructure needs. He is responsible for the operational evaluation of new equipment. He decides their commissioning and their withdrawal from service at the end of their life.

In terms of human resources, regarding the military personnel of the French Navy, he is responsible for their recruitment, initial and continuous training, discipline, morale and wellbeing, professional and career paths, as well as management of the workforce, jobs and skills. Regarding civilian personnel under his authority, he expresses the needs in terms of employment, manpower and skills. He takes part in the implementation of the ministerial policy concerning civilian personnel and participates in social dialogue bodies.

He has responsibilities in terms of risk management and nuclear safety.

== Authority and command ==
The authority of the Chief of the Naval Staff is exercised over several bodies:

- The Navy General Staff provides general management for the following entities, under the direction of the Major General of the Navy (French: Major général de la Marine, acronym: MGM) and through its seven bureaux (performance and synthesis, support and finance, plans and programs, naval air operations, international relations, nuclear affairs and risk management, human resources):
  - Navy Military Personnel Directorate, headed by a Vice-Admiral (acronym: DPMM);
  - Major force commands:
    - Vice-Admiral "ALFAN", commanding the Naval Action Force (FAN);
    - Vice-Admiral "ALFOST", commanding the Strategic Oceanic Force (FOST);
    - Commodore "ALAVIA", commanding the naval aviation force (AVIA);
    - Commodore "ALFUSCO", commanding the force of marines and commandos (FORFUSCO);
  - Maritime zone commanders:
    - Vice-Admiral, maritime prefect of the Mediterranean;
    - Vice-Admiral, maritime prefect of the Atlantic;
    - Vice-Admiral, maritime prefect of the English Channel and the North Sea;
    - Commodore "ALPACI", commanding the French Pacific Fleet and the armed forces in French Polynesia;
    - Commodore "ALINDIEN", commanding the Indian Ocean Maritime Zone (ZMOI) and the French Maritime Forces in the Indian Ocean;
    - Commodore "COMSUP FAA", commanding the French Armed Forces in the West Indies.
- The following services and departments:
- Inspectorate of the Navy (not to be confused with the General Inspectorate of the Armed Forces, which reports to the Minister of the Armed Forces);
- Navy Outreach Delegate;
- Permanent Commission for Fleet Vessel Programs and Testing;
- Navy Centre for Strategic Studies;
- Navy Public Relations Office (SIRPA Marine);
- Navy Logistics Service;
- Permanent Council for Boating Safety of the Navy;
- Permanent Council for Air Safety of the Navy;
- Permanent Secretariat of the Council for the Military Services of the Navy;
- Inspector of the health service for the Navy;

He chairs the board of directors of the Hydrographic and Oceanographic Service of the Navy (French: Service hydrographique et océanographique de la Marine, acronym: SHOM) and supervises the French Naval Academy on behalf of the Minister of the Armed Forces.

== History ==
Before the First World War, the Chief of the Naval Staff was above all the head of the military cabinet of the Minister of the Navy, and this mode of operation is the source of the name used; the officer who had effective authority over the Navy was then the admiral commanding the naval army, sometimes unofficially referred to as "amiralissime", in reference to the title of "généralissime" used at the time in the Army.

The First World War called all this into question, because an immense work of reorganisation had to be carried out at the headquarters in "rue Royale"a to conduct a long-lasting industrial maritime war and to be able to face the new threats posed by German submarines and underwater mines: a sort of "second staff" was even created, called the "directorate general for underwater warfare" (French: Direction générale de la guerre sous-marine, acronym: DGGSM) with sometimes overlapping areas of action; this observed redundancy logically led to the dissolution of the DGGSM at the end of the war and the attribution of its many prerogatives to the offices of the Navy General Staff.

In order to have a system allowing a flexible transition between peacetime — period of preparation — and wartime — period of action — the Vice-Admiral Chief of the Navy General Staff becomes, in the 1920s, the designated commander of the French maritime forces in the event of war, and the staff tasks fall in such circumstances to the Major General of the Navy, his first deputy in time of peace.

From 26 August 1939 to 6 June 1943, the organisation of the French Navy no longer included a general staff, but instead a "staff of the French maritime forces" which acted as such for the time of war. Admiral Darlan thus became commander-in-chief of the French maritime forces before being called to other functions in February 1941 in Vichy France.

After the Second World War, the gradual disappearance of the portfolio of Minister of the Navy led to entrusting part of the Minister's prerogatives to the Chief of the Naval Staff. However over time these prerogatives were taken over at the "joint" level by the staff of the armed forces and its chief: the Chief of the Defence Staff. The Chief of the Naval Staff thus lost his responsibilities for directing maritime operations to the Chief of the Defence Staff in 1971b.

In the 2000s, a large part of the organic prerogatives – force preparation – was again transferred to the Chief of the Defence Staff, but the Chief of the Naval Staff remained his main adviser regarding the preparation and employment of the Navy.

Admiral Bernard Louzeau decided at the end of the 1980s to replace the emblem of the French Navy, "a gold anchor intertwined with a cable", by a logo representing "a white ship’s bow with two blue and red waves". Admiral Pierre-François Forissier decided to provide the Navy with an anthem whose lyrics were written in 2011 by Lieutenant Christian Beauval and the music by the Chief of Music of the Armed Forces Didier Descamps, Chief of Music of the Brest fleet crews.

== List of chiefs ==
The following is a list of chiefs that served under the Third Republic, the French State, the Fourth Republic and the Fifth Republic:

=== Third Republic ===
No.	Portrait	Rank & Name	Term			Minister	Commander-in-Chief	Ref. (Note: Upper references are the official decree of nomination in French. Lower references are press articles in English.)
No.	Portrait	Rank & Name	Took office	Left office	Duration	Minister	Commander-in-Chief	Ref.
Office established
1		Contre-amiral (Note: Capitaine de vaisseau at the time of his appointment, promoted to Contre-amiral while in office.); Jules Krantz	9 March 1871	4 June 1873	2 years, 87 days	Louis Pothuau; Charles d'Hornoy	Adolphe Thiers; Patrice de MacMahon	-
2		Contre-amiral; Victor Duperré	4 June 1873	1 October 1874	1 year, 119 days	Charles d'Hornoy; Louis de Chauvance	Patrice de MacMahon	-
3		Contre-amiral; Henri Garnault	1 October 1874	12 March 1876	1 year, 163 days	Louis de Chauvance; Léon Fourichon	Patrice de MacMahon	-
4		Contre-amiral; Albert Roussin	12 March 1876	1 October 1877	1 year, 203 days	Léon Fourichon; Albert des Touches; Albert Roussin	Patrice de MacMahon	-
5		Contre-amiral; Abel-Nicolas Bergasse du Petit-Thouars	1 October 1877	12 February 1879	1 year, 134 days	Albert Roussin; Louis Pothuau; Jean Jauréguiberry	Patrice de MacMahon; Jules Grévy	-
6		Contre-amiral; Eugène Sellier	12 February 1879	2 August 1880	1 year, 172 days	Jean Jauréguiberry	Jules Grévy	-
7		Contre-amiral; Alexandre Peyron	2 August 1880	17 November 1881	1 year, 107 days	Jean Jauréguiberry; Georges Cloué; Auguste Gougeard	Jules Grévy	-
8		Capitaine de vaisseau Armand Besnard	17 November 1881	1 February 1882	76 days	Auguste Gougeard; Jean Jauréguiberry	Jules Grévy	-
9		Vice-amiral; Alexandre Peyron	1 February 1882	28 February 1883	1 year, 27 days	Jean Jauréguiberry; François de Mahy	Jules Grévy	-
10		Contre-amiral; Sébastien Lespès	28 February 1883	14 July 1885	2 years, 136 days	François de Mahy; Charles Brun; Alexandre Peyron; Charles-Eugène Galiber	Jules Grévy	-
11		Contre-amiral; Charles de la Jaille	14 July 1885	10 January 1886	180 days	Charles-Eugène Galiber; Théophile Aube	Jules Grévy	-
12		Contre-amiral; Louis-Henri Brown de Colstoun	10 January 1886	1 April 1887	1 year, 81 days	Théophile Aube	Jules Grévy	-
13		Capitaine de vaisseau Alfred Gervais	1 April 1887	2 June 1887	62 days	Théophile Aube; Édouard Barbey	Jules Grévy	-
14		Contre-amiral; Louis Alquier	2 June 1887	16 December 1887	197 days	Édouard Barbey; François de Mahy	Jules Grévy; Sadi Carnot	-
15		Contre-amiral; Alfred Le Timbre	16 December 1887	13 November 1889	1 year, 332 days	François de Mahy; Jules Krantz; Benjamin Jaurès; Jules Krantz; Édouard Barbey	Sadi Carnot	-
16		Vice-amiral; Louis Vignes	13 November 1889	11 February 1892	2 years, 90 days	Édouard Barbey	Sadi Carnot	-
17		Vice-amiral; Alfred Gervais	11 February 1892	22 September 1894	2 years, 223 days	Édouard Barbey; Godefroy Cavaignac [...] Auguste Lefèvre; Félix Faure	Sadi Carnot; Jean Casimir-Perier	-
18		Vice-amiral; Edgar Humann	22 September 1894	8 November 1895	1 year, 48 days	Félix Faure; Armand Besnard; Édouard Lockroy	Jean Casimir-Perier; Félix Faure	-
19		Contre-amiral; Charles Chauvin	8 November 1895	16 June 1896	221 days	Édouard Lockroy; Armand Besnard	Félix Faure	-
20		Vice-amiral; Jean de Lamornaix	16 June 1896	8 July 1898	2 years, 22 days	Armand Besnard; Édouard Lockroy	Félix Faure	-
21		Vice-amiral; Jules de Cuverville	8 July 1898	8 July 1899	1 year, 0 days	Édouard Lockroy; Jean-Marie de Lanessan	Félix Faure; Émile Loubet	-
22		Contre-amiral; Léonce Caillard	8 July 1899	1 May 1900	297 days	Jean-Marie de Lanessan	Émile Loubet	-
23		Vice-amiral; Amédée Bienaimé	1 May 1900	1 February 1902	1 year, 276 days	Jean-Marie de Lanessan	Émile Loubet	-
24		Contre-amiral (Note: Appointed "Chef d'état-major général avec le titre faisant fonction"; faisant fonction is a locution indicating that an officer is holding an office usually attached to a higher rank.); Ernest Marquer	1 February 1902	18 February 1904	2 years, 17 days	Jean-Marie de Lanessan; Camille Pelletan	Émile Loubet	-
25		Contre-amiral; Paul Campion	18 February 1904	29 January 1905	346 days	Camille Pelletan; Gaston Thomson	Émile Loubet	-
26		Vice-amiral; Charles Touchard	29 January 1905	1 November 1905	276 days	Gaston Thomson	Émile Loubet	-
27		Vice-amiral (Note: Contre-amiral at the time of his appointment, promoted to Vice-amiral while in office.); Charles Aubert	1 November 1905	23 August 1909	3 years, 295 days	Gaston Thomson; Alfred Picard; Auguste de Lapeyrère	Émile Loubet; Armand Fallières	-
28		Vice-amiral; Laurent Marin-Darbel	23 August 1909	15 February 1911	1 year, 176 days	Auguste de Lapeyrère	Armand Fallières	-
29		Vice-amiral; Paul Auvert	15 February 1911	1 February 1912	351 days	Auguste de Lapeyrère; Théophile Delcassé	Armand Fallières	-
30		Vice-amiral; Charles Aubert	1 February 1912	24 January 1913	358 days	Théophile Delcassé; Pierre Baudin	Armand Fallières	-
31		Vice-amiral; Pierre Ange Marie Le Bris	24 January 1913	26 May 1914	1 year, 122 days	Pierre Baudin; Ernest Monis; Armand Gauthier	Armand Fallières; Raymond Poincaré	-
32		Vice-amiral; Louis-Joseph Pivet	26 May 1914	5 December 1914	193 days	Armand Gauthier; Émile Chautemps; Armand Gauthier; Victor Augagneur	Raymond Poincaré	-
33		Vice-amiral; Charles Aubert	5 December 1914	7 June 1915†	184 days	Victor Augagneur	Raymond Poincaré	-
34		Vice-amiral; Eugène de Jonquières	9 June 1915	10 March 1916	275 days	Victor Augagneur; Lucien Lacaze	Raymond Poincaré	-
35		Vice-amiral; Ferdinand-Jean-Jacques de Bon	10 March 1916	16 April 1919	3 years, 37 days	Lucien Lacaze; Charles Chaumet; Georges Leygues	Raymond Poincaré	-
36		Vice-amiral; Pierre-Alexis Ronarc'h	16 April 1919	4 February 1920	294 days	Georges Leygues; Adolphe Landry	Raymond Poincaré	-
37		Vice-amiral; Henri Salaün	4 February 1920	26 January 1921	357 days	Adolphe Landry; Gabriel Guist'hau	Raymond Poincaré; Paul Deschanel; Alexandre Millerand	-
38		Vice-amiral; Maurice Grasset	26 January 1921	23 July 1924	3 years, 179 days	Gabriel Guist'hau; Flaminius Raiberti; Maurice Bokanowski; Désiré Ferry; Jacques-Louis Dumesnil	Alexandre Millerand; Gaston Doumergue	-
39		Vice-amiral; Henri Salaun	23 July 1924	11 January 1928	3 years, 172 days	Jacques-Louis Dumesnil; Émile Borel; Georges Leygues; René Renoult; Georges Leygues	Gaston Doumergue	-
40		Vice-amiral; Louis-Hippolyte Violette	11 January 1928	17 February 1931	3 years, 37 days	Georges Leygues; Albert Sarraut; Jacques-Louis Dumesnil; Albert Sarraut; Charles Dumont	Gaston Doumergue	-
41		Vice-amiral; Georges Durand-Viel	17 February 1931	31 December 1936	5 years, 318 days	Charles Dumont; Georges Leygues [...] François Piétri; Alphonse Duparc	Gaston Doumergue; Paul Doumer; Albert Lebrun	-
42		Amiral (Note: Vice-amiral at the time of his appointment, promoted to Amiral and bearing the title Amiral de la flotte while in office.); François Darlan	31 December 1936	25 June 1939	2 years, 176 days	Alphonse Duparc; César Campinchi; William Bertrand; César Campinchi	Albert Lebrun	-

=== French State ===
No.	Portrait	Rank & Name	Term			Minister	Commander-in-Chief	Ref.
No.	Portrait	Rank & Name	Took office	Left office	Duration	Minister	Commander-in-Chief	Ref.
(42)		Amiral (Note: From 25 June 1939, his full style was The admiral of the Fleet, Commander-in-chief of the French Naval Forces.); François Darlan	25 June 1939	2 September 1941	2 years, 69 days	César Campinchi; François Darlan	Albert Lebrun; Philippe Pétain	-
43		Contre-amiral; Gabriel Auphan	2 September 1941	18 November 1942	1 year, 77 days	François Darlan	Philippe Pétain	-
44		Vice-amiral d'escadre Maurice Le Luc	21 November 1942	1 April 1943	131 days	Jean Abrial	Philippe Pétain	-

=== Fourth Republic ===
No.	Portrait	Rank & Name	Term			Minister (Note: The Minister of the Navy was responsible until 1947, after which the Minister of the Armed Forces took over.)	Commander-in-Chief	Ref.
No.	Portrait	Rank & Name	Took office	Left office	Duration	Minister	Commander-in-Chief	Ref.
45		Vice-amiral d'escadre (Note: Contre-amiral at the time of his appointment, promoted to Vice-amiral and Vice-amiral d'escadre while in office.); André Lemonnier	7 August 1943	28 May 1950	6 years, 294 days	Philippe Auboyneau; Louis Jacquinot [...] Paul Ramadier; René Pleven	Charles de Gaulle; Félix Gouin; Georges Bidault; Léon Blum; Vincent Auriol	-
46		Vice-amiral; Robert Battet	28 May 1950	14 July 1950†	47 days	René Pleven; Jules Moch	Vincent Auriol	-
47		Vice-amiral; Roger-Gabriel Lambert	10 August 1950	26 October 1951	1 year, 77 days	Jules Moch; Georges Bidault	Vincent Auriol	-
48		Amiral; Henri Nomy	26 October 1951	19 May 1960	8 years, 206 days	Georges Bidault; René Pleven [...] Pierre Guillaumat; Pierre Messmer	Vincent Auriol; René Coty; Charles de Gaulle	- -

=== Fifth Republic ===
No.	Portrait	Rank & Name	Term			Minister	Commander-in-Chief	Ref.
No.	Portrait	Rank & Name	Took office	Left office	Duration	Minister	Commander-in-Chief	Ref.
49		Amiral; Georges Cabanier	19 May 1960	1 January 1968	7 years, 227 days	Pierre Messmer	Charles de Gaulle	-
50		Amiral; André Patou	1 January 1968	1 May 1970	2 years, 120 days	Pierre Messmer; Michel Debré	Charles de Gaulle; Georges Pompidou	- -
51		Amiral; André Storelli	1 May 1970	1 February 1972	1 year, 276 days	Michel Debré	Georges Pompidou	- -
52		Amiral; Marc de Joybert	1 February 1972	14 July 1974	2 years, 163 days	Michel Debré; Robert Galley; Jacques Soufflet; Yvon Bourges	Georges Pompidou; Valéry Giscard d'Estaing	- -
53		Amiral; Albert Joire-Noulens	14 July 1974	1 August 1976	2 years, 18 days	Yvon Bourges	Valéry Giscard d'Estaing	-
54		Amiral; Jean-René Lannuzel	1 August 1976	1 August 1982	6 years, 0 days	Yvon Bourges; Joël Le Theule; Robert Galley; Charles Hernu	Valéry Giscard d'Estaing; François Mitterrand	-
55		Amiral; Yves Leenhardt	1 August 1982	30 January 1987	4 years, 182 days	Charles Hernu; Paul Quilès; André Giraud	François Mitterrand	-
56		Amiral; Bernard Louzeau	30 January 1987	20 November 1990	3 years, 294 days	André Giraud; Jean-Pierre Chevènement	François Mitterrand	-
57		Amiral; Alain Coatanéa	20 November 1990	1 July 1994	3 years, 223 days	Jean-Pierre Chevènement; Pierre Joxe; François Léotard	François Mitterrand	-
58		Amiral; Jean-Charles Lefebvre	1 July 1994	2 May 1999	4 years, 305 days	François Léotard; Charles Millon; Alain Richard	François Mitterrand; Jacques Chirac	-
59		Amiral; Jean-Luc Delaunay	2 May 1999	1 July 2001	2 years, 60 days	Alain Richard	Jacques Chirac	-
60		Amiral; Jean-Louis Battet	1 July 2001	15 June 2005	3 years, 349 days	Alain Richard; Michèle Alliot-Marie	Jacques Chirac	
61		Amiral; Alain Oudot de Dainville	15 June 2005	4 February 2008	2 years, 234 days	Michèle Alliot-Marie; Hervé Morin	Jacques Chirac; Nicolas Sarkozy	
62		Amiral; Pierre-François Forissier	4 February 2008	12 September 2011	3 years, 220 days	Hervé Morin; Alain Juppé; Gérard Longuet	Nicolas Sarkozy	-
63		Amiral; Bernard Rogel	12 September 2011	13 July 2016	4 years, 305 days	Gérard Longuet; Jean-Yves Le Drian	Nicolas Sarkozy; François Hollande	
64		Amiral; Christophe Prazuck	13 July 2016	1 September 2020	4 years, 50 days	Jean-Yves Le Drian; Sylvie Goulard; Florence Parly	François Hollande; Emmanuel Macron	
65		Amiral; Pierre Vandier	1 September 2020	31 August 2023	2 years, 364 days	Florence Parly; Sébastien Lecornu	Emmanuel Macron	
66		Amiral; Nicolas Vaujour	1 September 2023	Incumbent	3 years, 36 days	Sébastien Lecornu	Emmanuel Macron	

== See also ==
- Chief of the Defence Staff
  - Chief of Staff of the French Army
  - Chief of Staff of the French Air Force
  - Special Operations Command
  - Directorate General of the National Gendarmerie
