= Jules François Émile Krantz =

French naval officer and politician

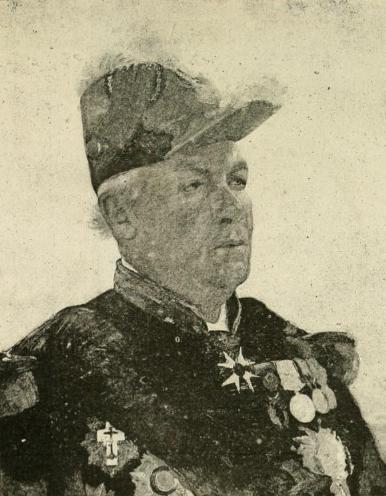
- Krantz by Alfred Philippe Roll (1891)

Minister of the Navy of France
- In office 19 March – 10 November 1889
- President: Sadi Carnot
- Prime Minister: Pierre Tirard
- Preceded by: Benjamin Jaurès
- Succeeded by: Édouard Barbey

Governor of Cochinchina
- Acting
- In office 16 March – 30 November 1874
- President: Patrice MacMahon
- Prime Minister: Albert de Broglie; Ernest Courtot de Cissey
- Minister of the Navy and Colonies: Charles de Dompierre d'Hornoy; Louis Raymond de Montaignac de Chauvance
- Preceded by: Marie Jules Dupré
- Succeeded by: Victor Auguste, baron Duperré

Chief of Staff of the Navy of France
- In office 9 March 1871 – 4 June 1873
- President: Adolphe Thiers; Patrice de MacMahon
- Prime Minister: Jules Armand Dufaure; Albert de Broglie
- Minister of the Navy: Louis Pothuau; Charles de Dompierre d'Hornoy
- Preceded by: Office established
- Succeeded by: Victor Duperré

Personal details
- Born: 29 December 1812 Givet, France
- Died: 25 February 1914 (aged 101) Toulon, France
- Occupation: Naval officer

Jules François Émile Krantz (29 December 1821 in Givet – 25 February 1914 near Toulon) was a French naval officer and politician. In Vietnamese royal records, he was referred as Ca Răng (哥𪘵).

== Life ==
He left the École navale in 1837, initially serving off the west African coast and then in the Mediterranean and Brazil. He was professor of navigation on board the Borda (1852). He commanded the Ténare during the Crimean War, taking part in the attacks on Sebastopol and the Kinbourn peninsula. He was then sent to Vietnam (1858–59) and the China Sea and Japan (1862–64, where he took part in the bombardment of Pei-Ho). He was then commander of the gunnery-school ship Louis XIV at Cherbourg (1869).

He commanded the naval division on the China Sea in 1873 and became military governor of Cochinchine from 16 March to 30 November 1874. He took part in the Franco-Prussian War, commanding the marines at fort d'Ivry. In 1877 he was promoted to vice admiral, followed by becoming maritime prefect of Toulon in October 1879. He later became chief of staff becoming Minister for the Navy and the Colonies from 5 January 1888 to 22 February 1889, then naval minister from March to November 1889.

He was a cousin of Camille Krantz.

== Sources ==
- Étienne Taillemite, Dictionnaire des marins français, éditions Tallandier, 2002, 573 p. (ISBN 2-84734-008-4)
