= List of naval ministers of France =

Minister of the Navy and Colonies
- Ministre de la Marine et des Colonies
- Ensign of France (1848–present)
- Ministry of the Navy (Ministère de la Marine)
- Formation: 14 September 1547
- First holder: Côme Clausse
- Final holder: Louis Jacquinot
- Abolished: 22 October 1947
- Succession: Minister of Defence; Minister of the Overseas

One of France's Secretaries of State under the Ancien Régime was entrusted with control of the French Navy (Secretary of State of the Navy (France).) In 1791, this title was changed to Minister of the Navy. Before January 1893, this position also had responsibility for France's colonies, and was usually known as Minister of the Navy and Colonies, a role thereafter taken by the Minister of the Overseas. In 1947 the naval ministry was absorbed into the Ministry of Defence, with the exception of merchant marine affairs which had been split in 1929 to the separate Ministry of Merchant Marine.

== History ==
The two primary formations of the French Navy, the Ponant Fleet and Levant Fleet, were placed under the control of Jean-Baptiste Colbert in 1662, whilst he was "intendant des finances" and "minister of state" – but not "secretary of state" : he only became secretary of state in 1669 after having bought his way into the post. From then on, right up to the French Revolution, a secretary of state had responsibility for the French navy.

The secretary of state was responsible for the administration of both the navy (the "marine royale") and civilian (merchant marine) fleets, and for all France's ports, arsenals, consulates, and colonies, as well as the guardianship for all her commercial companies.

To his two original offices (the bureau du Ponant and bureau du Levant) other services were added over time:

- archives department, 1669;
- office of the Ponant consulates, 1709;
- office of the colonies, 1710;
- bureau des classes, 1711;
- department of maps and plans, 1720;
- Office of the Levant Consulates, 1738, which was in 1743 merged with the Office of the Ponant Consulates under the name of Office of Commerce and Consulates

These different offices and departments were regrouped into four super-departments by marshal de Castries in 1786.

== List of officeholders ==
=== Secretaries of State for the Navy, 1547–1790 ===
Secretary	Began	Ended
Côme Clausse, seigneur de Marchaumont	14 September 1547	1558
Florimond II Robertet, seigneur de Fresnes	1558	October 1567
Claude de l’Aubespine, seigneur d’Hauterive	1 April 1547	1567
Jacques Bourdin, seigneur de Villeines	1558	1567
Martin Ruze, seigneur de Beaulieu	15 September 1588	6 November 1613
Antoine de Loménie, seigneur de la Ville aux Clercs	7 November 1613	10 August 1615 (he left the post on this date, but retained the precedence and the functions)
Henri Auguste de Loménie, seigneur de la Ville aux Clercs	13 July 1615	February 1643
Henry de Guénegaud, marquis de Plancy	23 March 1643	1662
Hugues de Lionne, marquis de Fresne	4 February 1662	1669
Jean-Baptiste Colbert	7 March 1669	6 September 1683
Jean-Baptiste Colbert, Marquis de Seignelay	September 1683	3 November 1690
Louis Phélypeaux, comte de Pontchartrain	7 November 1690	6 September 1699
Jérôme Phélypeaux, comte de Pontchartrain	6 September 1699	1 October 1715
Louis Alexandre de Bourbon, comte de Toulouse and Victor Marie d'Estrées (Presidents of the Council of Marine)	1 October 1715	24 September 1718
Joseph Jean Baptiste Fleuriau d'Armenonville	24 September 1718	28 February 1722
Charles Jean-Baptiste Fleuriau, comte de Morville	28 February 1722	16 August 1723
Jean-Frédéric Phélypeaux, comte de Maurepas	16 August 1723	23 April 1749
Antoine Louis Rouillé	30 April 1749	24 July 1754
Jean Baptiste de Machault D'Arnouville	24 July 1754	1 February 1757
François Marie Peyrenc de Moras	1 February 1757	31 May 1758
Claude Louis d'Espinchal, marquis de Massiac	31 May 1758	31 October 1758
Nicolas René Berryer	31 October 1758	13 October 1761
Étienne François, duc de Choiseul	13 October 1761	10 April 1766
César Gabriel de Choiseul-Chevigny, duc de Praslin	10 April 1766	24 December 1770
Joseph Marie Terray	24 December 1770	9 April 1771
Pierre Étienne Bourgeois de Boynes	9 April 1771	20 July 1774
Anne Robert Jacques Turgot	20 July 1774	24 August 1774
Antoine de Sartine	24 August 1774	13 October 1780
Charles Eugène Gabriel de La Croix, marquis de Castries	13 October 1780	24 August 1787
Armand Marc, comte de Montmorin Saint-Hérem	25 August 1787	24 December 1787
César Henri, comte de La Luzerne	24 December 1787	13 July 1789
Arnaud de Laporte	13 July 1789	16 July 1789
César Henri, comte de La Luzerne	16 July 1789	26 October 1790

=== Ministers of the Navy and the Colonies, 1790–1893 ===
Minister	Began	Ended
Charles Pierre Claret de Fleuriau	26 October 1790	17 May 1791
Antoine Jean Marie Thévenard	17 May 1791	18 September 1791
Claude Antoine Valdec de Lessart	18 September 1791	7 October 1791
Antoine François, comte Bertrand de Molleville	7 October 1791	16 March 1792
Jean de Lacoste	16 March 1792	21 July 1792
François Joseph de Gratet, vicomte Dubouchage	21 July 1792	10 August 1792
Gaspard Monge	10 August 1792	10 April 1793
Jean Dalbarade (commissioner from 20 April 1794)	10 April 1793	2 July 1795
Jean-Claude Redon de Beaupréau (commissioner)	2 July 1795	4 November 1795
Laurent Jean François Truguet	4 November 1795	15 July 1797
Georges René Le Peley de Pléville	15 July 1797	27 April 1798
Étienne Eustache Bruix	27 April 1798	4 March 1799
Charles Maurice de Talleyrand-Périgord	7 March 1799	2 July 1799
Marc Antoine Bourdon de Vatry	2 July 1799	22 November 1799
Pierre-Alexandre-Laurent Forfait	22 November 1799	3 October 1801
Denis Decrès	3 October 1801	1 April 1814
Pierre Victor, baron Malouet	3 April 1814	7 September 1814
Jacques, comte Beugnot	7 September 1814	20 March 1815
Denis, duc Decrès	20 March 1815	7 July 1815
François Arnail, comte de Jaucourt	9 July 1815	26 September 1815
François Joseph de Gratet, vicomte Dubouchage	26 September 1815	23 June 1817
Laurent, Marquis de Gouvion Saint-Cyr	23 June 1817	12 September 1817
Mathieu Louis, comte Molé	12 September 1817	29 December 1818
Pierre Barthélemy, baron Portal	29 December 1818	14 December 1821
Aimé, duc de Clermont-Tonnerre	14 December 1821	4 August 1824
Christophe, comte de Chabrol de Crouzol	4 August 1824	3 March 1828
Jean-Guillaume, baron Hyde de Neuville	3 March 1828	8 August 1829
Henri Gauthier, comte de Rigny	8 August 1829	23 August 1829
Charles Lemercier de Longpré, baron d'Haussez	23 August 1829	31 July 1830
Henri Gauthier, comte de Rigny	31 July 1830	11 August 1830
Horace François Bastien, baron Sébastiani	11 August 1830	17 November 1830
Antoine, comte d'Argout	17 November 1830	13 March 1831
Henri Gauthier, comte de Rigny	13 March 1831	4 April 1834
Albin Reine, baron Roussin	4 April 1834	19 May 1834
Louis Léon, comte Jacob	19 May 1834	10 November 1834
Charles, baron Dupin	10 November 1834	18 November 1834
Victor Guy, baron Duperré	18 November 1834	6 September 1836
Claude Charles Marie du Campe de Rosamel	6 September 1836	31 March 1839
Jean Marguerite Tupinier	31 March 1839	12 May 1839
Victor Guy, baron Duperré	12 May 1839	1 March 1840
Albin Reine, baron Roussin	1 March 1840	29 October 1840
Victor Guy, baron Duperré	29 October 1840	7 February 1843
Albin Reine, baron Roussin	7 February 1843	24 July 1843
Ange René Armand, baron de Mackau	24 July 1843	9 May 1847
Louis Napoléon Lannes, duc de Montebello	9 May 1847	24 February 1848
François Arago	24 February 1848	11 May 1848
Joseph Grégoire Cazy	11 May 1848	28 June 1848
Jules Bastide	28 June 1848	17 July 1848
Raymond-Jean-Baptiste de Verninac Saint-Maur	17 July 1848	20 December 1848
Alexandre César Victor Charles Destutt de Tracy	20 December 1848	31 October 1849
Joseph Romain-Desfossés	31 October 1849	9 January 1851
Théodore Ducos	9 January 1851	24 January 1851
Auguste Nicolas Vaillant	24 January 1851	10 April 1851
Justin de Chasseloup-Laubat	10 April 1851	26 October 1851
Hippolyte Fortoul	26 October 1851	3 December 1851
Théodore Ducos	3 December 1851	17 April 1855
Ferdinand Hamelin	19 April 1855	24 November 1860
Justin de Chasseloup-Laubat	24 November 1860	20 January 1867
Charles Rigault de Genouilly	20 January 1867	4 September 1870
Léon Martin Fourichon	4 September 1870	19 February 1871
Louis Marie Alexis Pothuau	19 February 1871	25 May 1873
Charles Dompierre d'Hormoy	25 May 1873	22 May 1874
Louis Raymond de Montaignac de Chauvance	22 May 1874	9 March 1876
Léon Martin Fourichon	9 March 1876	17 May 1877
Albert Gicquel des Touches	17 May 1877	23 November 1877
Albert Roussin	23 November 1877	13 December 1877
Louis Marie Alexis Pothuau	13 December 1877	4 February 1879
Jean Bernard Jauréguiberry	4 February 1879	29 January 1880
Georges Charles Cloué	29 January 1880	14 November 1881
Auguste Gougeard (Marine only)	14 November 1881	30 January 1882
Jean Bernard Jauréguiberry	30 January 1882	29 January 1883
François de Mahy	31 January 1883	31 February 1883
Charles Brun	31 February 1883	9 August 1883
Alexandre Louis François Peyron	9 August 1883	6 April 1885
Charles Eugène Galiber	6 April 1885	7 January 1886
Théophile Aube	7 January 1886	30 May 1887
Édouard Barbey	30 May 1887	12 December 1887
François de Mahy	12 December 1887	5 January 1888
Jules-François-Émile Krantz	5 January 1888	22 February 1889
Benjamin Jaurès	22 February 1889	13 March 1889
Jules François Émile Krantz (Marine only)	19 March 1889	10 November 1889
Édouard Barbey (Marine only)	10 November 1889	27 February 1892
Godefroy Cavaignac (Marine only to 8 March 1892)	27 February 1892	8 March 1892
Auguste Burdeau	8 March 1892	11 January 1893

=== Naval Ministers, 1893–1947 ===
Minister	Began	Ended
Adrien, Barthélemy, Louis, Henri Rieunier	12 January 1893	3 December 1893
Auguste Alfred Lefèvre	3 December 1893	30 May 1894
Félix Faure	30 May 1894	17 January 1895
Armand Louis Charles Gustave Besnard	17 January 1895	1 November 1895
Édouard Locroy	1 November 1895	29 April 1896
Armand Louis Charles Gustave Besnard	29 April 1896	28 June 1898
Édouard Locroy	28 June 1898	22 June 1899
Jean-Marie de Lanessan	22 June 1899	7 June 1902
Charles Camille Pelletan	7 June 1902	24 January 1905
Gaston Thomson	24 January 1905	22 October 1908
Alfred Picard	22 October 1908	24 July 1909
Augustin Boué de Lapeyrère	24 July 1909	2 March 1911
Théophile Delcassé	2 March 1911	21 January 1913
Pierre Baudin	21 January 1913	9 December 1913
Ernest Monis	9 December 1913	20 March 1914
Armand Gauthier de l'Aude	20 March 1914	9 June 1914
Émile Chautemps	9 June 1914	13 June 1914
Armand Gauthier de l'Aude	13 June 1914	3 August 1914
Victor Augagneur	3 August 1914	29 October 1915
Lucien Lacaze	29 October 1915	2 August 1917
Charles Chaumet	2 August 1917	16 November 1917
Georges Leygues	16 November 1917	20 January 1920
Adolphe Landry	20 January 1920	16 January 1921
Gabriel Guist'hau	16 January 1921	15 January 1922
Flaminius Raiberti	15 January 1922	29 March 1924
Maurice Bokanowski	29 March 1924	9 June 1924
Désiré Ferry	9 June 1924	14 June 1924
Jacques-Louis Dumesnil	14 June 1924	17 April 1925
Émile Borel	17 April 1925	28 November 1925
Georges Leygues	28 November 1925	19 July 1926
René Renoult	19 July 1926	23 July 1926
Georges Leygues	23 July 1926	21 February 1930
Albert Sarraut	21 February 1930	2 March 1930
Jacques-Louis Dumesnil	2 March 1930	13 December 1930
Albert Sarraut	13 December 1930	27 January 1931
Charles Dumont	27 January 1931	20 February 1932
Georges Leygues	3 June 1932	2 September 1933
Albert Sarraut	6 September 1933	30 January 1934
Louis de Chappedelaine	30 January 1934	9 February 1934
François Piétri	9 February 1934	1 June 1936
Alphonse Gasnier-Duparc	1 June 1936	22 June 1937
César Campinchi	22 June 1937	18 January 1938
William Bertrand	18 January 1938	13 March 1938
César Campinchi	13 March 1938	16 June 1940
François Darlan	16 June 1940	18 April 1942
Émile Muselier (commissioner for the navy, Free France)	24 September 1941	4 March 1942
Philippe Auboyneau (commissioner for the navy, Free France)	4 March 1942	7 June 1943
Gabriel Auphan	18 April 1942	18 November 1942
Jean-Marie Charles Abrial	18 November 1942	26 March 1943
Henri Bléhaut	26 March 1943	19 August 1944
Louis Jacquinot (commissioner for the navy, Free France)	9 November 1943	10 September 1944
Louis Jacquinot (Provisional Government, 1st Ministry of Charles de Gaulle)	10 September 1944	21 November 1945
Louis Jacquinot	22 January 1947	22 October 1947

== See also ==
- Minister of the Armies (France)
- Minister of Air (France)
- Minister of the Colonies (France)
- Minister of the Overseas (France)
- Minister of Merchant Marine (France)
