= Arnaud de Tarlé =

French Navy officer

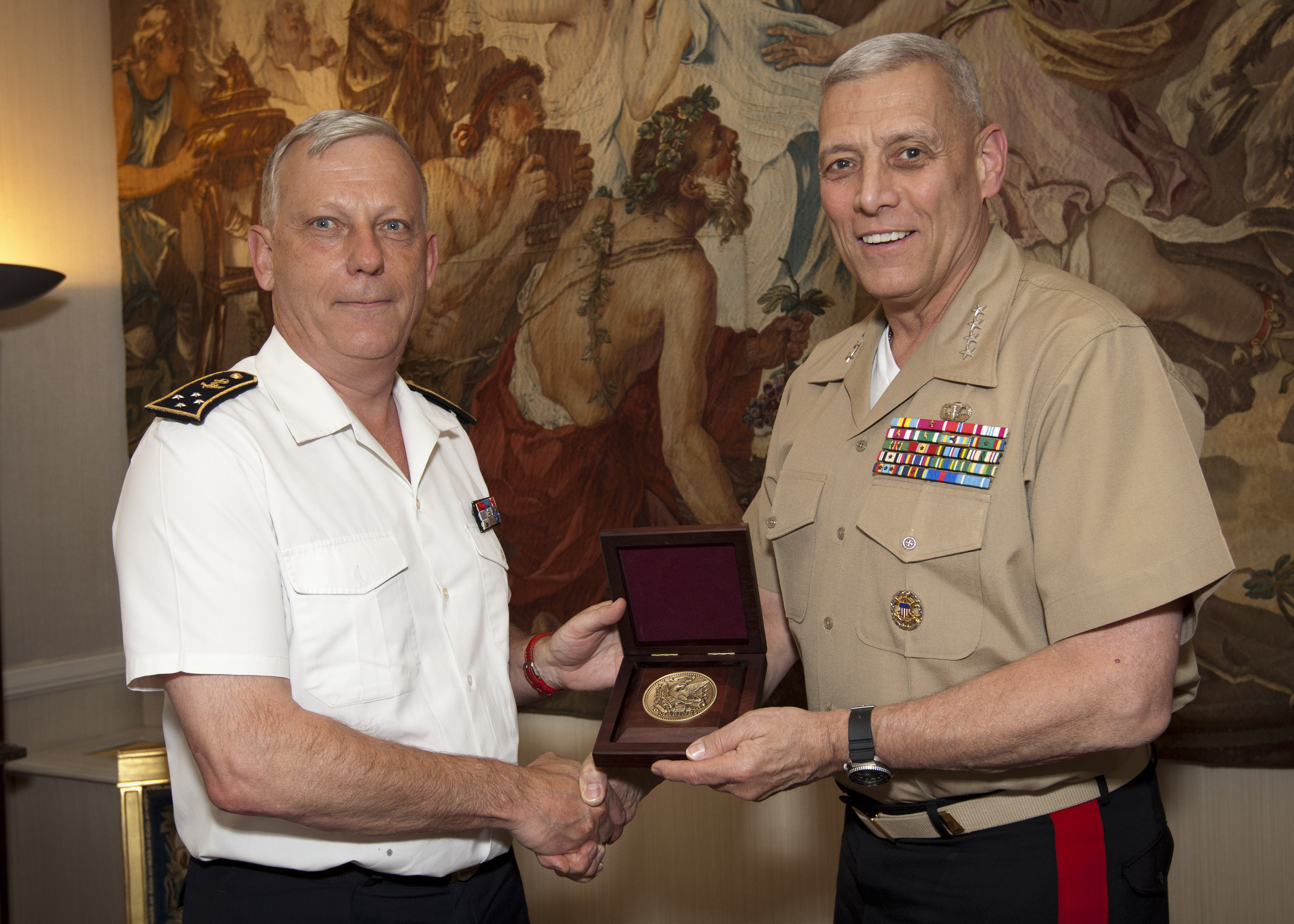
- Military career
- Allegiance: France
- Branch: French Navy
- Service years: 1980 -
- Rank: Vice Admiral
- Commands: Chief of Staff of the French Navy

Vice Admiral Arnaud de Tarlé is a French Navy officer, currently serving as Chief of the French Navy.
