= Henri Salaün =

French naval officer (1866–1936)

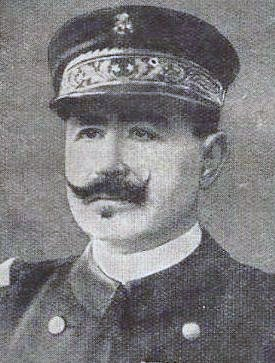
French admiral Henri Salaun in 1917.

Vice admiral Henri Salaun (1866–1936) was an admiral in the French Navy. From 1 February 1920 to 1 February 1921, and again from 22 July 1924 to 31 December 1927, he was Chief of Staff of the French Navy. With the naval minister Georges Leygues he tried to get government funding priority for naval re-armament in coastal defence and the fleet, but many of the projects they initiated were delayed or cancelled due to priority instead being given to Army projects such as the Maginot Line (since Germany was seen as the main enemy and thus land re-armament as the priority). He did, however, preside over the opening of new docks and a deep-water basin at Le Havre on Bastille Day 1928, shortly after also presiding over a naval review at the port. He was the paternal grandfather of the squash player Henri Salaun.
