= La Reine Pedauque (barge) =

History

France
- Name: La Reine Pédauque
- Operator: Green Beenz SAS
- Port of registry: Lyon LY1873
- Route: Dijon-Vandenesse (Canal de Bourgogne)
- Builder: Geste Munde, Dortmund
- Launched: 1922
- Christened: unknown
- Status: In service

General characteristics
- Class & type: Commercial passenger vessel, 'Freycinet' type
- Tonnage: 250
- Length: 38.50 m (126.3 ft)
- Beam: 5.05 m (16.6 ft)
- Height: 3.65 m (12.0 ft)
- Draught: 1.45 m (4.8 ft)
- Decks: 2
- Propulsion: Baudouin DK4, 73.60 kW
- Speed: 13 km/h maximum, usually 6 km/h on canal
- Capacity: 8 passengers
- Crew: 5 crew
- Notes: Holds 7000 litres water and 900 litres fuel

La Reine Pédauque is a former freight-carrying barge of Freycinet type, converted into a hotel barge and operating on the Canal de Bourgogne in central France. She is one of around 60 barges offering cruises on the smaller waterways of Europe, mainly France.

== History ==
La Reine Pédauque is one of relatively few barges of Freycinet dimensions built in Germany, at the Dortmund yard of Geeste Munde. Built in 1922, she operated throughout the French canal system carrying various dry cargoes such as grain and aggregates. She was converted into a hotel barge and renamed in 1984. She was acquired and refitted by the current owners in 2016, and operates on the Canal de Bourgogne in the Ouche valley, between Dijon and Vandenesse.
