= Paul Campion (French Navy officer) =

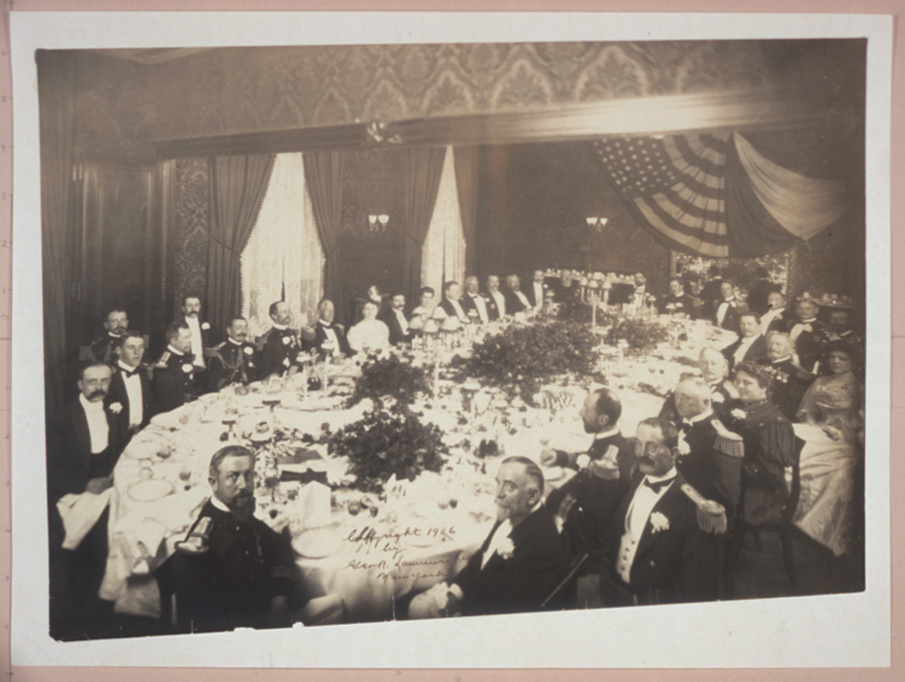
Dinner in honor of Admiral Campion, Delmonico's, New York, 2 May 1906

Paul Campion was a contre-amiral (rear admiral) in the French Navy. From 18 February 1904 to 2 February 1905 he was Chief of Staff of the French Navy.

On 21 April 1906, a squadron of three armored cruisers, under Rear-Admiral Campion's command, arrived at Annapolis to honor John Paul Jones after the identification and return of his body from Paris to the United States that month.
