= Freycinet Plan =

French public works programme

The Freycinet Plan (French: Plan Freycinet) was an ambitious public works programme, launched in 1878 by the Minister of Public Works Charles de Freycinet, principally for the construction of railways, but also for canals and maritime ports. In its initial codification – which very largely was superseded – the plan foresaw the hypothecation of 3 billion francs to the railway lines, 1 billion to the canals and 500 million to the ports.

== Characteristics ==
The project became part of the Finance Act in January 1878. Freycinet, being close to Léon Gambetta and Léon Say, the Minister of Finance, organised a meeting between them all to prepare the political terrain. A first law was voted in on 18 May 1878, creating the Compagnie des Chemins de Fer de l'État ("State Railway Company"), by acquisition of several other companies.

On 8 June, a report was published. The main objective of the Freycinet plan was to give every French person access the railway, so as to favour the economic development of the country and to open up remote areas. It was made law on 17 July 1879.

The plan foresaw the construction of 8,700 kilometres (5,400 mi) of railway. They were built both by large private companies, mostly underwritten by the State, and by the State itself: Freycinet had formed the State Railway Company with the law of 18 May 1878.

In 1879, Freycinet became President of the Council of Ministers. He chose Henri Varroy to succeed him as Minister for Public Works and implement his plan. He brought in the engineer Alfred Picard, who was named Director of Railways in 1882.

The implementation of the Freycinet Plan took until 1914, and it was completed fully. However, many chefs-lieux were only served by small meandering metre gauge railways, of somewhat mediocre quality.

== Classification of lines ==
The 181 lines listed below are numbered and designated in conformance with the law of 17 July 1879, and represent a total of 8,848 kilometres (5,498 mi) of route.

- The first list proposed by Freycinet starting in 1878 comprised 154 new lines and 53 lines already with concessions as voies ferrées d'intérêt local, and this list was discussed at length both in committee and by the Chamber of Deputies and the Senate.
- 94 lines, totalling 4,152 kilometres (2,580 mi), were the object of amendments referred to the Minister of Public Works, and were not put into law.

List of 181 lines written into the law of 17 July 1879
1. Armentières – Lens, via Don — 24 km
2. Armentières – Tourcoing and – Roubaix — 19 km
3. Roubaix – the Belgian border, near Audenarde — 2 km
4. Valenciennes – Denain and Lourches, via or near Trith-Saint-Léger — 11 km
5. Denain – Saint-Amand — 14 km
6. Don – Templeuve — 20 km
7. Lille (la Madeleine) – Lannoy, via le Breucq, l’Empempont and Ham — 12 km
8. Ormoy – la vallée de l’Ourcq, via or near Betz — 20 km
9. From a point on the line from Villers-Cotterets – Château-Thierry – one station – established on the Paris line – Avricourt, between the stations of Trilport and Changis — 28 km
10. Hirson – Busigny, with a branch from or near Wimy – Guise — 84 km
11. Solre-le-Château – Avesnes — 12 km
12. Valenciennes – Laon, via or near le Cateau — 107 km
13. Laon – Mézières, via or near Rozoy (Aisne) — 90 km
14. From a point – determined by the line from Mézières – Hirson, via Rocroy, – the Belgian border, near Chimay — 16 km
15. Soissons – Réthel, via la vallée de l’Aisne — 77 km
16. Montmédy – Stenay or – Dun — 24 km
17. Baroncourt – Étain — 11 km
18. Revigny – Saint-Dizier — 28 km
19. Melun – la Ferté-sous-Jouarre, via or near Rozoy and Coulommiers — 68 km
20. Esbly – un point – determined by the line from Gretz – Coulommiers, between Faremoutier and Coulommiers — 22 km
21. Laon – or near Château-Thierry — 64 km
22. Provins – Esternay, via or near Villiers-Saint-Georges — 29 km
23. Fère-Champenoise – Vitry-le-François — 50 km
24. Avallon – Bourges, via or near Clamecy, Cosne and Sancerre (taking in the Chatel-Censoir – Sermizelles depression) — 143 km
25. Cosne – Saint-Sauveur — 34 km
26. Auxerre – Vitry-le-François, via or near Saint-Florentin, Troyes and Brienne — 145 km
27. Gerbéviller (Meurthe-et-Moselle) – Bruyères (Vosges) — 45 km
28. Jussey – la ligne d’Épinal and – Aillevillers — 72 km
29. Prolongement de la ligne de Remiremont – Saint-Maurice-sur-Moselle jusqu’à Bussang — 4 km
30. Bas-Évette (Belfort) – Giromagny — 7 km
31. Lure – Loulans-les-Forges, via Villersexel — 38 km
32. Interchange between the Ceinture de Paris line (left bank) the Paris – ou près Auneau line — 1 km
33. Interchange between the Ceinture de Paris line (left bank) and that of the Pont de l’Alma – Courbevoie — 1 km
34. Interchange between the Grande-Ceinture line, – Saint-Germain-en-Laye, and the actual station of Saint-Germain — 3 km
35. Raccordement entre la ligne de Grande-Ceinture, près l’Étang-la-Ville, and la ligne de Paris – Versailles (rive droite), vers Saint-Cloud — 15 km
36. Rambouillet – a point – determined by the line from Pontoise – Gisors, entre Ws-Marines and Chars, passing by a point determined between Mantes and Meulan — 62 km
37. Palaiseau – Épinay-sur-Orge — 17 km
38. Paris (gare spéciale) – ou près Auneau — 65 km
39. From the departmental borders of Seine-et-Oise and Eure-et-Loir, near Auneau, – Melun, via or near Étampes — 58 km
40. Eu – Dieppe — 37 km
41. Dieppe – Le Havre — 92 km
42. Pont-Audemer – the Pont-l’Évêque line – Honfleur — 16 km
43. Pont-Audemer – Port-Jérôme, with steam ferry on the Seine — 19 km
44. Interchange, between Quévilly and Sotteville, on the Chemins de fer d’Orléans – Rouen and from Paris – Rouen — 5 km
45. Interchange, near Elbeuf, of the d’Orléans line – Rouen and de Serquigny – Rouen — 2 km
46. Vire – Saint-Lô — 43 km
47. Fougères – Vire and – a point somewhere between Bayeux and Caen — 123 km
48. Cherbourg – Beaumont-Hague (Channel) — 16 km
49. Carentan – the Sottevast line – Coutances — 19 km
50. Coutances – Regnéville — 8 km
51. From the Channel coast, towards Avranches, – Domfront (Orne) — 9 km
52. Sablé – Sillé-le-Guillaume — 44 km
53. Connerré – Courtalain — 49 km
54. Niort – Montreuil-Belley, with a branch to Moncontour — 116 km
55. Benet – the ligne de Niort – Ruffec — 9 km
56. From the boundary of la Sarthe (near la Flèche) – Saumur and interchanging at the stations of Saumur — 51 km
57. Saumur – Château-du-Loir, via or near Noyant and Château-la-Vallière, with interchange at Savigny – the Château-du-Loir – Saint-Calais line — 63 km
58. Tours – Savigny, with interchange – the line from Vendôme – Pont-de-Bray, between Vendôme and Montoire — 69 km
59. Saint-Aignan, via Contres, towards Blois — 30 km
60. Nantes – Ségré — 77 km
61. Beslé – ou près la Chapelle-sur-Erdre, via Blain — 41 km
62. Pouancé (Maine-et-Loire) – a point somewhere on the line from Paris – Rennes, between Laval and le Genest, via or near Craon — 58 km
63. Interchange, – Pontorson, the lines of Saint-Lô – Lamballe and de Fougère – la baie du Mont-Saint-Michel — 1 km
64. Miniac – la Gouesnière, via Châteauneuf (Ille-et-Vilaine) — 11 km
65. La Brohinière – Dinan (Côtes-du-Nord) and Dinan – Dinard (Ille-et-Vilaine) — 55 km
66. Châteaubriant – Ploërmel, via or near Bain and Messac — 88 km
67. Auray – Quiberon (Morbihan) — 26 km
68. Saint-Brieuc au Légué (Côtes-du-Nord) — 7 km
69. Guingamp – Paimpol (Côtes-du-Nord) — 36 km
70. Carhaix – Guingamp, via Callac — 46 km
71. La Brohinière – la ligne de Châteaulin – Landerneau, via Loudéac and Carhaix — 168 km
72. Concarneau – Rosporden (Finistère) — 14 km
73. Carhaix – ou près Quimperlé and Carhaix – ou près Morlaix — 112 km
74. Morlaix – Roscoff (Finistère) — 26 km
75. Brest au Conquet (Finistère) — 24 km
76. Châteaulin – Camaret (Finistère) — 46 km
77. Quimper – Douarnenez (Finistère) and Quimper – Pont-l’Abbé (Finistère) — 39 km
78. D’un point entre Machecoul and la Roche-sur-Yon – ou près Challans au goulet de Fromentine (Vendée) — 24 km
79. Velluire – Parthenay, via Fontenay-le-Comte and Breuil-Barret – Fontenay-le-Comte – Cholet — 172 km
80. Surgères – Marans — 31 km
81. Saint-Laurent-de-la-Prée au fort d’Enet (Charente-Inférieure) — 9 km
82. Saint-Jean-d’Angély – Civray, avec embranchement sur Cognac, via Matha — 110 km
83. Saujon (Charente-Inférieure) – un point de la ligne de Tonnay-Charente – Marennes — 31 km
84. Barbezieux – un point – déterminer entre Montendre and Cavignac — 48 km
85. Bordeaux (gare spéciale) ) ou près Cavignac (Gironde) — 36 km
86. La Sauve – Eymet, via or near Targon, Sauveterre, Monségur and Duras — 62 km
87. Libourne – ou près Langon — 43 km
88. De la gare de Moulis (ligne du Médoc) au port de Lamarque — 6 km
89. Châtellerault – Tournon-Saint-Martin (Indre) — 41 km
90. Loudun – Châtellerault — 47 km
91. Preuilly – Tournon-Saint-Martin (Indre) — 15 km
92. Le Blanc – Argent — 161 km
93. Issoudun – Bourges, via Saint-Florent — 21 km
94. Le Dorat – Magnac-Laval (Haute-Vienne) — 7 km
95. Confolens – Bellac — 39 km
96. Ruffec – Excideuil — 40 km
97. Nontron – ou près Sarlat, en passant via or near Thiviers, Villiac and Condat, avec embranchement d’Hautefort – un point – déterminer entre Objat and Brives (entraînant la suppression de la ligne de Nontron – Périgueux) — 137 km
98. Bussière-Galant – ou près Saint-Yrieix (Haute-Vienne) — 16 km
99. Limoges – Brive, via Uzerche, avec raccordement via la vallée de la Vézère and Treignac avec la ligne de Limoges – Meymac — 131 km
100. Uzerche – Aurillac, via or near Tulle and Argentat — 83 km
101. D’un point – déterminer sur la ligne de Châteauroux – Limoges, entre Forgevieille and Eguzon, – ou près Guéret — 44 km
102. Felletin – Bort, via Ussel — 70 km
103. Felletin – Bourganeuf — 45 km
104. Montluçon – Eygurande, via or near Evaux and Auzances — 92 km
105. Lavaud-Franche – la ligne de Montluçon – Eygurande, via or near Chambon — 20 km
106. Saint-Éloi au col de Vauriat and raccordement du col de Gouttières – la ligne de Montluçon – Eygurande — 83 km
107. Sancoins – ou près Lapeyrouse, via or near Montmarault — 75 km
108. Bort – Neussargues (Cantal) — 60 km
109. Laqueuille au Mont-d’Or, via la Bourboule — 15 km
110. Villeneuve-sur-Lot – Tonneins and – Falgueyrat — 72 km
111. Cahors – ou près Moissac — 58 km
112. Nevers – Tamnay (Nièvre) — 50 km
113. Tamnay – Château-Chinon — 23 km
114. De Châtillon-sur-Seine – ou près Montchanin, via or near les Laumes and Épinac — 156 km
115. Chagny, via Seurre, – un point – déterminer sur la ligne de Dôle – Dijon — 64 km
116. Vichy – Cusset — 4 km
117. Givors – Paray-le-Monial, via or near l’Arbresle — 125 km
118. Paray-le-Monial – un point – déterminer entre Saint-Martin-d’Estréaux and la Palisse — 44 km
119. Champagnole – ou près Ambérieu, via la Cluse, avec embranchement sur Morez and embranchement de Verges – Jeurre — 184 km
120. Lons-le-Saunier – Champagnole — 44 km
121. De la ligne de Lyon – Genève – Gex and – Divonne — 39 km
122. Gilley (Doubs) – Pontarlier — 23 km
123. Voujeaucourt (Doubs) – Saint-Hippolyte — 27 km
124. Saint-Hippolyte – la ligne de Besançon – Morteau — 47 km
125. La Roche – Saint-Gervais et – Chamonix (Haute-Savoie) — 70 km
126. Albertville – Annecy — 44 km
127. La Mure (Isère) – la ligne de Grenoble – Gap — 32 km
128. Savines (Hautes-Alpes) – Barcelonnette — 37 km
129. Nyons – la ligne de Lyon – Marseille, via Valréas — 41 km
130. Vaison – Orange — 27 km
131. Traversée du Rhône – Avignon — 4 km
132. Volx – Apt, avec embranchement sur Forcalquier — 53 km
133. Sorgues – Saint-Saturnin (Vaucluse) — 8 km
134. L’Isle – Orange, via Carpentras — 38 km
135. Valdonne (Bouches-du-Rhône) – la ligne de Carnoules – Aix — 9 km
136. Salon – la Calade, via Lambesc — 32 km
137. Digne – Draguignan, via or near Castellane — 115 km
138. Digne – la ligne de Savines – Barcelonnette — 80 km
139. Draguignan – Cagnes, via Grasse — 75 km
140. Draguignan – Mirabeau, via Barjols — 96 km
141. Nice – Puget-Théniers — 56 km
142. Nice – Coni, via la vallée du Paillon, le contrefort de Braous, Sospel, le contrefort de Broïs and Fontan — 52 km
143. Ajaccio – Propriano (Corse) — 55 km
144. Ponte-Leccia – Calvi (Corse) — 79 km
145. Cazamozza – Bonifacio (Corse) — 150 km
146. Ambert – la ligne du Puy – Saint-Georges-d’Aurac — 62 km
147. D’un point – déterminer sur la ligne d’Issoire – Neussargues – un point – déterminer, dans la direction de Saint-Étienne, sur la ligne de Montbrison – Monistrol — 92 km
148. Saint-Étienne, via or near Pélussin and Annonay, – la rive droite du Rhône, – un point – déterminer entre Serrières and Sarras — 60 km
149. Largentière – l’embranchement d’Aubenas — 13 km
150. La Voulte-sur-Rhône – Yssingeaux, via or near le Cheylard (Ardèche) — 101 km
151. Tournon (Ardèche) – la ligne de la Voulte – Yssingeaux — 40 km
152. Yssingeaux – la ligne du Puy – Saint-Étienne — 20 km
153. Anduze – un point de la ligne de Rodez – Millau, entre Séverac-le-Château and Millau, avec embranchement sur Florac — 101 km
154. Montpellier – Ganges — 48 km
155. Espalion – la ligne de Rodez – Séverac-le-Château — 21 km
156. Estréchoux (Hérault) – Castanet-le-Haut — 12 km
157. Lunas – Lodève — 14 km
158. Saint-Chinian – ou près Saint-Pons — 26 km
159. Carmaux – un point – déterminer entre Vindrac and Laguépie — 25 km
160. La Bastide-Rouairoux (Tarn) – Bize (Aude) — 36 km
161. Agde – la mer — 4 km
162. Saint-Girons – Foix — 44 km
163. D’un point – déterminer entre Pamiers and Saint-Antoine-de-Foix – un autre point – déterminer entre Limoux and Quillan — 41 km
164. Lavelanet (Ariège) – la ligne de Castelnaudary – Carcassonne — 61 km
165. Quillan – Rivesaltes (Pyrénées-Orientales) — 69 km
166. Prades – Olette (Pyrénées-Orientales) — 15 km
167. Vicdessos – Tarascon (Ariège) — 14 km
168. Saint-Girons – Seix (Ariège) — 17 km
169. Ligne de ceinture de Toulouse — 10 km
170. Castelsarrasin – Lombez — 73 km
171. Auch – Lannemezan — 66 km
172. Lannemezan – Arreau (Hautes-Pyrénées) — 26 km
173. Chaum (Haute-Garonne) – la frontière espagnole, au Pont-du-Roy — 14 km
174. Auch – Bazas, passant via or near Eauze — 143 km
175. Saint-Sever – Pay, – Dax and – Mont-de-Marsan — 134 km
176. Vic-en-Bigorre – la ligne de Saint-Sever – Pau — 35 km
177. Nérac – Mont-de-Marsan, via or near Mézin, Sos and Villeneuve-de-Marsan — 91 km
178. Oloron – Bedous (Basses-Pyrénées) — 27 km
179. Oloron – la ligne de Puyoô – Saint-Palais, via la vallée du gave d’Oloron — 45 km
180. Saint-Martin-Autevielle – Mauléon — 26 km
181. Bayonne – Saint-Jean-Pied-de-Port, avec embranchement d’Ossés – Saint-Étienne-de-Baïgorry — 58 km

== Motivation ==
Beside the economic considerations, the plan had a political objective: to promote the Third Republic in the rural areas, who were often hostile to the new régime.

== Criticism ==
According to some analysts, the Freycinet Plan caused considerable upheaval and can be shown to have been a cause of difficulties in French industry at the end of the 19th century in the competitive international economy.

Albert Broder, Professor of History at the University of Paris-XII, explains this forcefully:

La forte demande suscitée via le plan Freycinet, and que les industriels Français ont du mal – satisfaire, semble avoir été – l'origine d'un abandon, sans doute considéré temporaire, des marchés extérieurs jugés moins rémunérateurs via les industriels, ces derniers confiants en des carnets de commandes remplis – des niveaux plus que satisfaisants. Leur confiance dans l'avenir suscite des investissements tout au long de la filière, de la construction de hauts fourneaux – la production de tôles and de rails d'acier. Politique contre-cyclique au moment où le marché international est en plein marasme [...]. La crise que connaissent les industries métallurgiques, – la suite de l'abandon des grands travaux and devant la récession qui se généralise, ne se traduit pas via une plus grande pugnacité – l'extérieur. Fragilisées via des investissements qu'elles ne peuvent rapidement amortir, les entreprises manquent de la trésorerie nécessaire

— Albert Broder, La longue stagnation en France, l'autre grande dépression, 1873-1897

The strong demand aroused by the Freycinet plan, with which the French industrialists had such difficulty – seemingly satisfied – was the cause of their abandoning, no doubt temporarily, those external markets they judged less profitable, confident of full order books – and at a greater level than they could meet. Their confidence in the future sustained their investments throughout the supply chain, from the construction of blast furnaces – the production of sheet metal and steel rails. Whirlwind politics at the time where the international market was in the doldrums[...]. The crisis which hit the metallurgy industries – then the abandoning of the great works and the general recession, was not transferred to a greater pugnacity – the outside world. Encumbered by investments which they could not quickly liquidise, the enterprises lacked the necessary assets.
