= Henri Bléhaut =

French politician and counter admiral

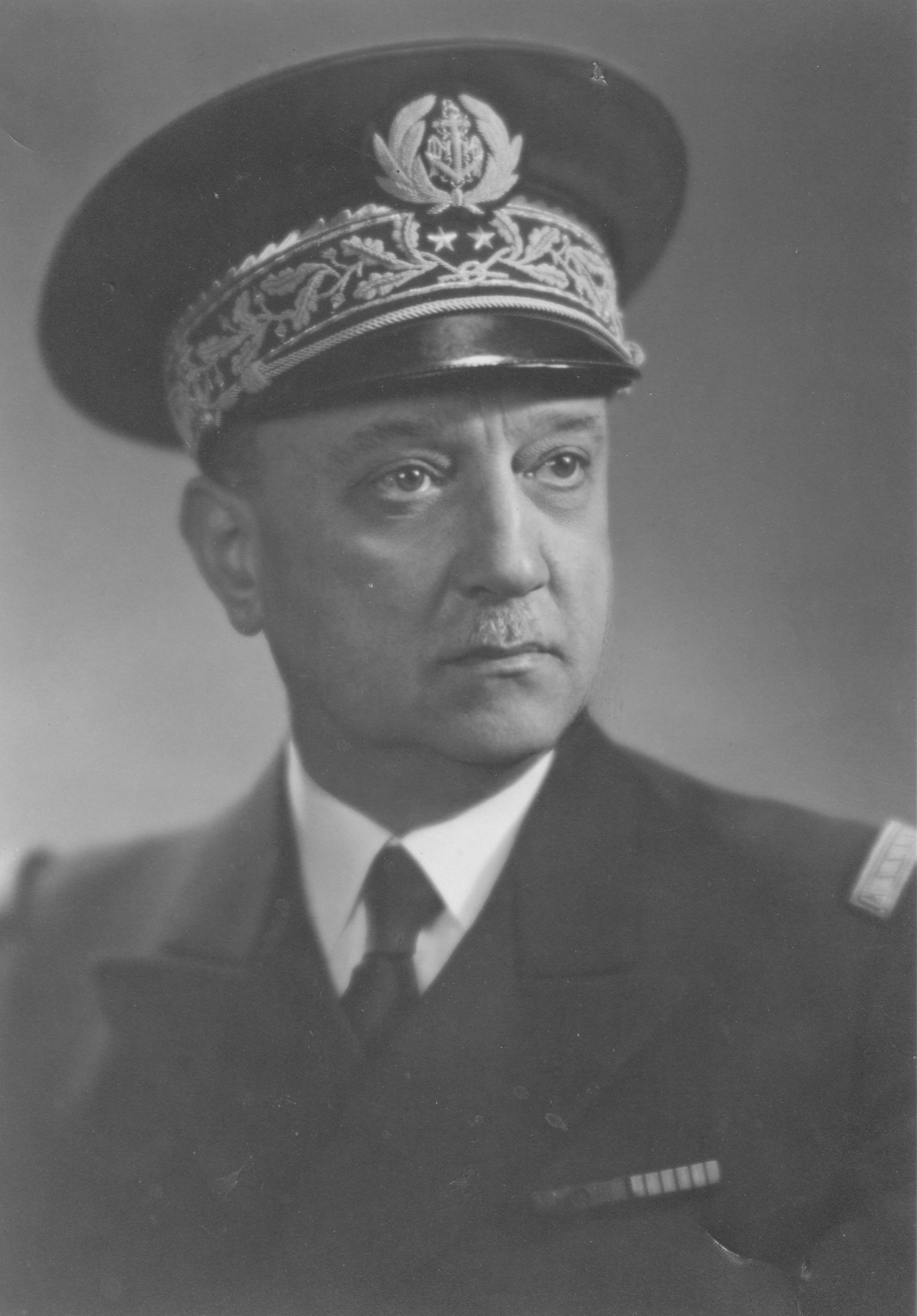
- Counter admiral Henri Bléhaut (1940)
- Born: 22 November 1889; Lyon, France
- Died: 12 August 1962 (aged 72); Paris, France
- Military career
- Branch: French Navy
- Service years: 1908–1944
- Rank: Counter admiral
- Conflicts: World War I World War II
- Awards: Legion of Honor (France); War Cross 1914–1918 (France)
- Other work: Secretary of State for the Navy and the Colonies (1943–1944)

Henri Paul Arsène Bléhaut (22 November 1889 – 8 December 1962) was a French politician and counter admiral. He was Secretary of State for the Navy and the Colonies from 26 March 1943 to 10 September 1944 in Vichy France.

== Life ==
=== Early career ===
In 1908, he entered the École navale. On the outbreak of the First World War he was attached to the torpedo-boat Commandant-Rivière on operations against the Austro-Hungarian fleet in the Adriatic, particularly during the evacuation of the Serbian Army. He was mentioned in dispatches for his bravery in battle on the night of 22 December 1916. He commanded four submarines (Cigogne, Clorindre, Joëssel and Requin) between 1918 and 1927. He commanded the surface ships Panthère and Lamotte-Picquet in 1927. In May 1929 he was put in command of the 11th Torpedo Boat Division in the Mediterranean on board the Alcyonand reveals himself as "an exceptionally talented officer and a brilliant maneuverer". From 1932 to 1934 he was chief of staff of French naval staff in the Far East on board the Primauguet. From 1936 to 1938 he commanded Maillé-Brézé and a destroyer flotilla. In 1938 he became chief of staff of the maritime prefecture of Toulon.

=== World War II ===
From 1939 to 1941 he became chief of staff to the French naval forces in the Mediterranean fleet then chief of staff of the French naval forces of the south. During this period he was also promoted to counter admiral in 1940. His next post came in 1941, as commander of the 3rd Cruiser Division, flying his flag on La Marseillaise at Toulon. It lasted until 1942. On the Allied landings in North Africa on 13 November 1942, he tried in vain to convince Jean de Laborde, commander-in-chief of Vichy France's high seas fleet, to sail his force to Africa. At dawn on 27 November that year, when German forces arrived in the Toulon arsenal, he ordered its cruisers to scuttle themselves.

In 1943, he was approached to become Vichy's Secretary of State for the Navy and the Colonies. He hesitated but decided to take it up to avoid the post falling into pro-German hands. From then onwards "he never stopped struggling at all times against the German and Italian armistice commissions, sabotaging any work in the arsenals that would assist the enemy and saving personnel in the naval and colonial ministry from being sent to Germany. Thanks to him, naval security worked to inform the Allies and naval infrastructure was preserved".

On 20 August 1944, he and Philippe Pétain were arrested at Vichy by the Gestapo commander in Vichy and the German Military Police. He was taken to Sigmaringen. The new French authorities dismissed him from the navy in September 1944. Bléhaut was part of Pétain's inner circle when Pétain was evacuated from Sigmaringen at the end of April 1945 ahead of the Allied advance. After crossing into Switzerland, Pétain and his circle voluntarily surrendered at the border post at Valborde a few days later. Bléhaut was thus imprisoned at Fresnes Prison in the suburbs of Paris. He was provisionally freed in March 1946, but he decided to flee to Switzerland rather than appear before the Haute Cour de Justice. He was found guilty of crimes against state security and of 'indignité nationale' by that court and condemned in his absence to 10 years' imprisonment and national degradation. He voluntarily returned to France in 1955. The decree revoking him was annulled by the Conseil d'État in May 1956.

In 1946, Lieutenant-Commander André Storelli, decorated with the Resistance Medal and who would later be Admiral and Chief of Staff of the French Navy (1970–1972), gave a testimony on the actions of Admiral Bléhaut:

"Admiral, first of all, just as we have seen our efforts officially rewarded for having executed your orders, I affirm that you are entitled to the gratitude of the Resistance, . [...] All those who knew you and had the honor of serving you, in the difficult circumstances in which you were their leader, know that your action was only inspired by the desire to defend, within your sphere of command, what remained of our Navy capacity. None of them had to be ashamed of his actions by complying with your orders. [...] You gave them [these officers] direction and advice, either verbally or through your staff, to fight in all areas against the occupier. It was with your full consent that the Navy spontaneously and very largely made available to the resistance the means at its disposal. [...] I can assure you that you have done the maximum. [...] In addition, many adversaries, particularly suspicious of the sailors, surrounded us, and it was obvious that a more direct action would have unmasked you immediately, resulting in the immediate control by the enemy of the means valuable and effective you still had.".

== Awards ==
- Legion of Honor – Commander (France)
- War Cross 1914–1918 (France)
- Medal of Military Values – Silver (Italy)
- Order of the Savior – Officer (Greece)
- Order of the Star of Romania – Officer (Romania)
- Order of the Rising Sun – 4th class (Japan)
- Order of Leopold – Commander (Belgium)
