= Jean-Claude Redon de Beaupréau =

French politician

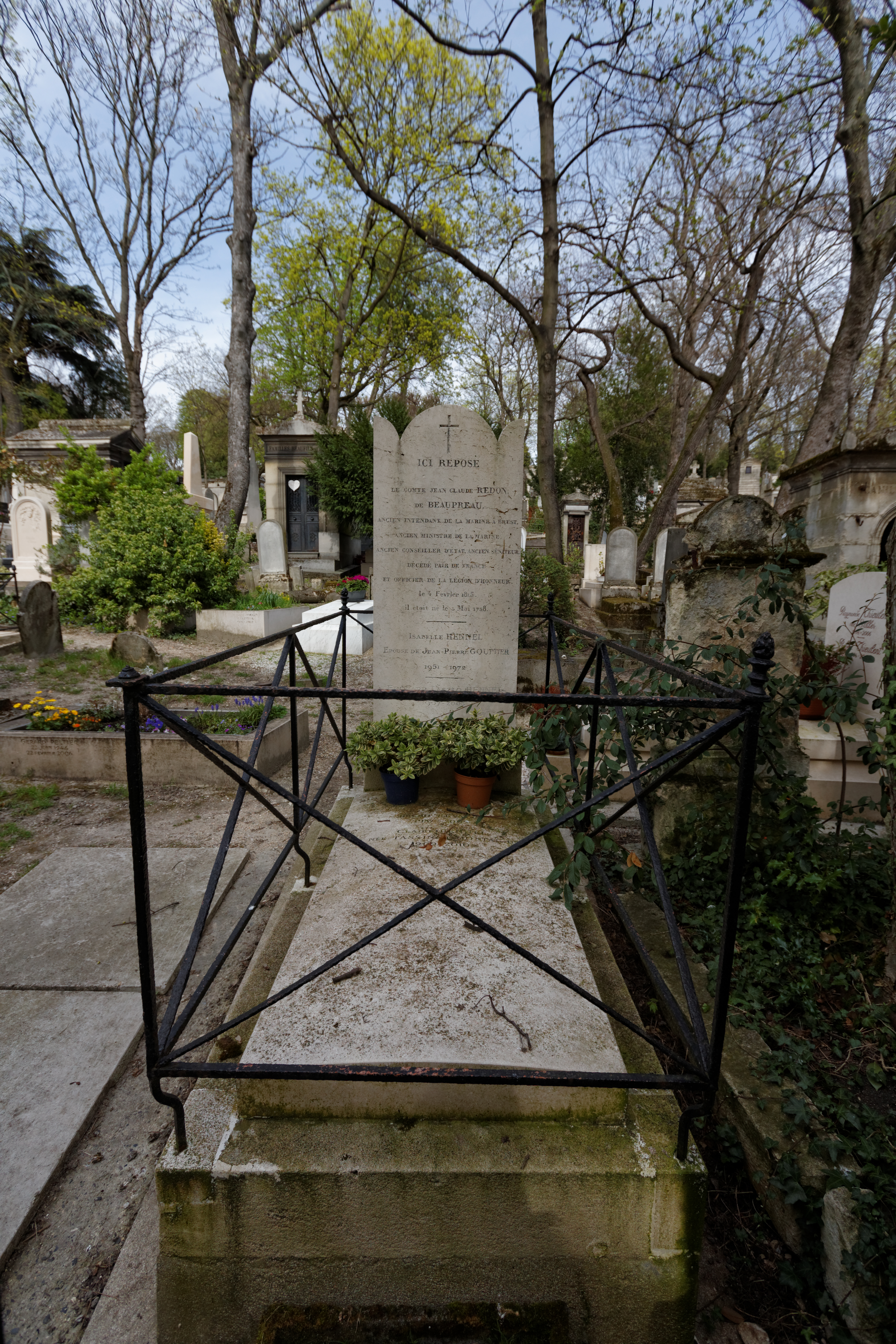
Tomb in the cimetière du Père-Lachaise.

Count Jean Claude Redon de Beaupréau (2 May 1738, Thouars – 4 February 1815, Paris) was a French politician.

== Life ==
Born into an old Breton family, in 1757 he joined the naval administration as part of the comte de Moras's ministry. Commissioner to Le Havre and Martinique, he was made naval controller at Rochefort in 1777 by Louis XVI on the suggestion of M. de Sartine.

During the maréchal de Castries's ministry, he was made commissioner general and intendant of the port of Brest in 1784, a post he retained until the French Revolution. Suspected of being a royalist, he was persecuted during the Reign of Terror, deprived of his property in 1791, arrested and imprisoned at Brest then Carhaix (1793 to end of 1794). He was only freed after 9 thermidor.

After the Constitution de l'an III was adopted, he was a member of the executory committee for the navy and the colonies (6 July 1795 - 5 November 1796). In 1797 he became a candidate for the moderate faction in the French Directory. An experienced administrator who favoured the 18 brumaire, he was made a counsellor of state attached to the naval section, then president of the 'conseil des prises' on 4 April 1800. There he defended the course system as conforming to the French spirit of adventure.

On 20 July 1800 he became maritime prefect of Lorient and on 25 prairial year 12 he was made a member of the Légion d'honneur, rising to commander in the order on 14 June 1804. In 1805 he joined the counsel of state. In April 1808 he was made a count of the empire and on 5 February 1810 a member of the Sénat conservateur.

He did not attend the 1 April 1814 sitting and thus did not sign the senate's address to the French people to absolve them of their loyalty oath to Napoleon I, but he voted for Napoleon's deposition the following day. On 4 June 1814 he was made a peer of France by Louis XVIII. He died only a few weeks before Napoleon's escape from Elba. He was buried in the 10th division of the cimetière du Père-Lachaise.

== Bibliography ==
- Jean-Baptiste-Pierre Jullien de Courcelles, Histoire généalogique et héraldique des pairs de France : des grands dignitaires de la couronne, des principales familles nobles du royaume et des maisons princières de l'Europe, précédée de la généalogie de la maison de France, publié par L'auteur, 1827
- Jean-Philippe Zanco, Dictionnaire des Ministres de la Marine 1689-1958, S.P.M. Kronos, Paris 2011.
