= Jean-Marie Charles Abrial =

French admiral and naval minister

Jean-Marie-Charles Abrial
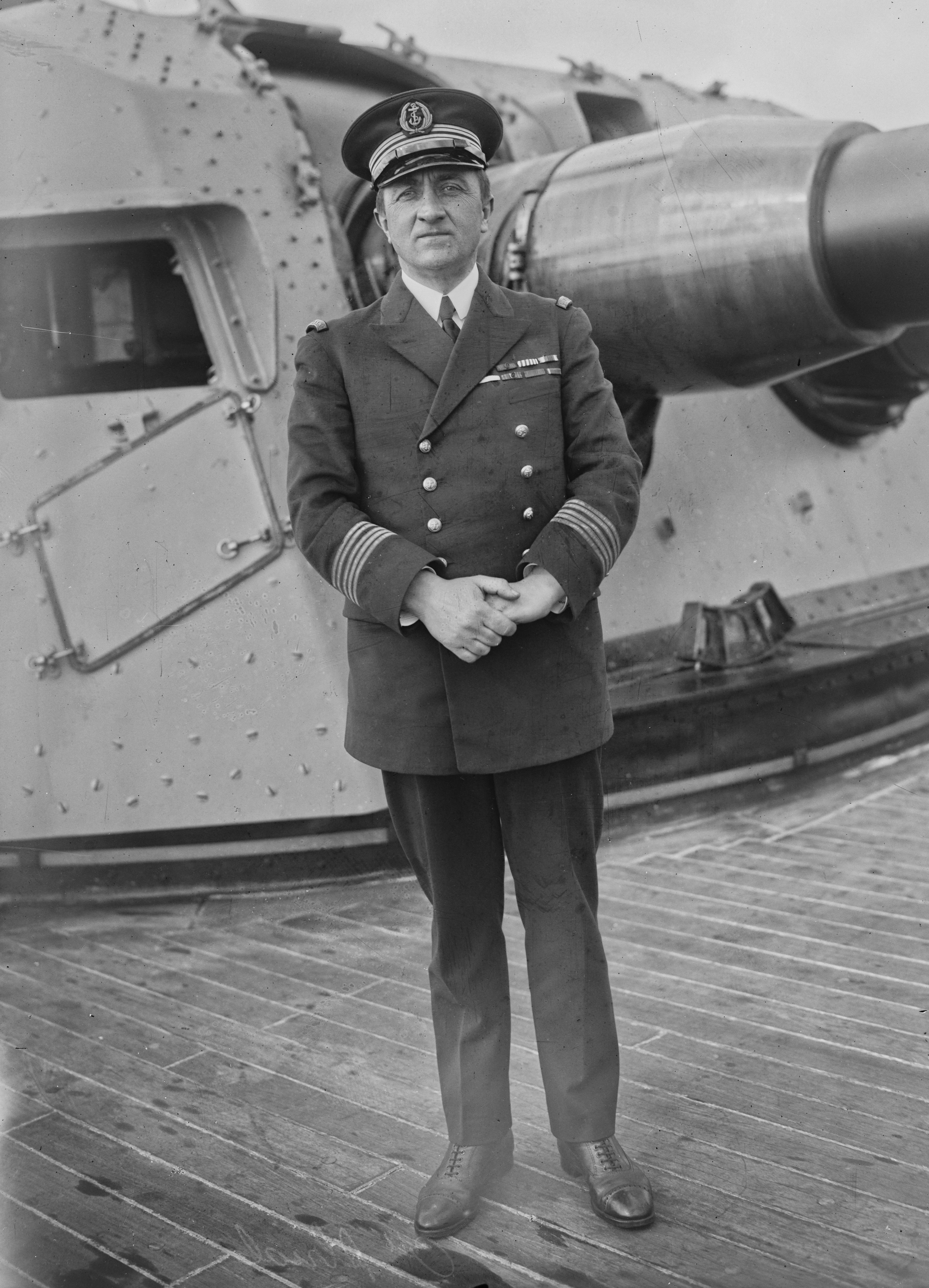
- Jean-Marie-Charles Abrial in 1929
- Born: 17 December 1879; Réalmont, France
- Died: 19 December 1962 (aged 83); Dourgne, France
- Military career
- Allegiance: France
- Branch: French Navy
- Rank: Vice-amiral

Jean-Marie Charles Abrial (French pronunciation: [ʒɑ̃ maʁi ʃaʁl abʁijal]; 17 December 1879 – 19 December 1962) was a French Admiral and Naval Minister. He fought in both World wars, and was known mostly for his actions at Dunkirk in 1940.

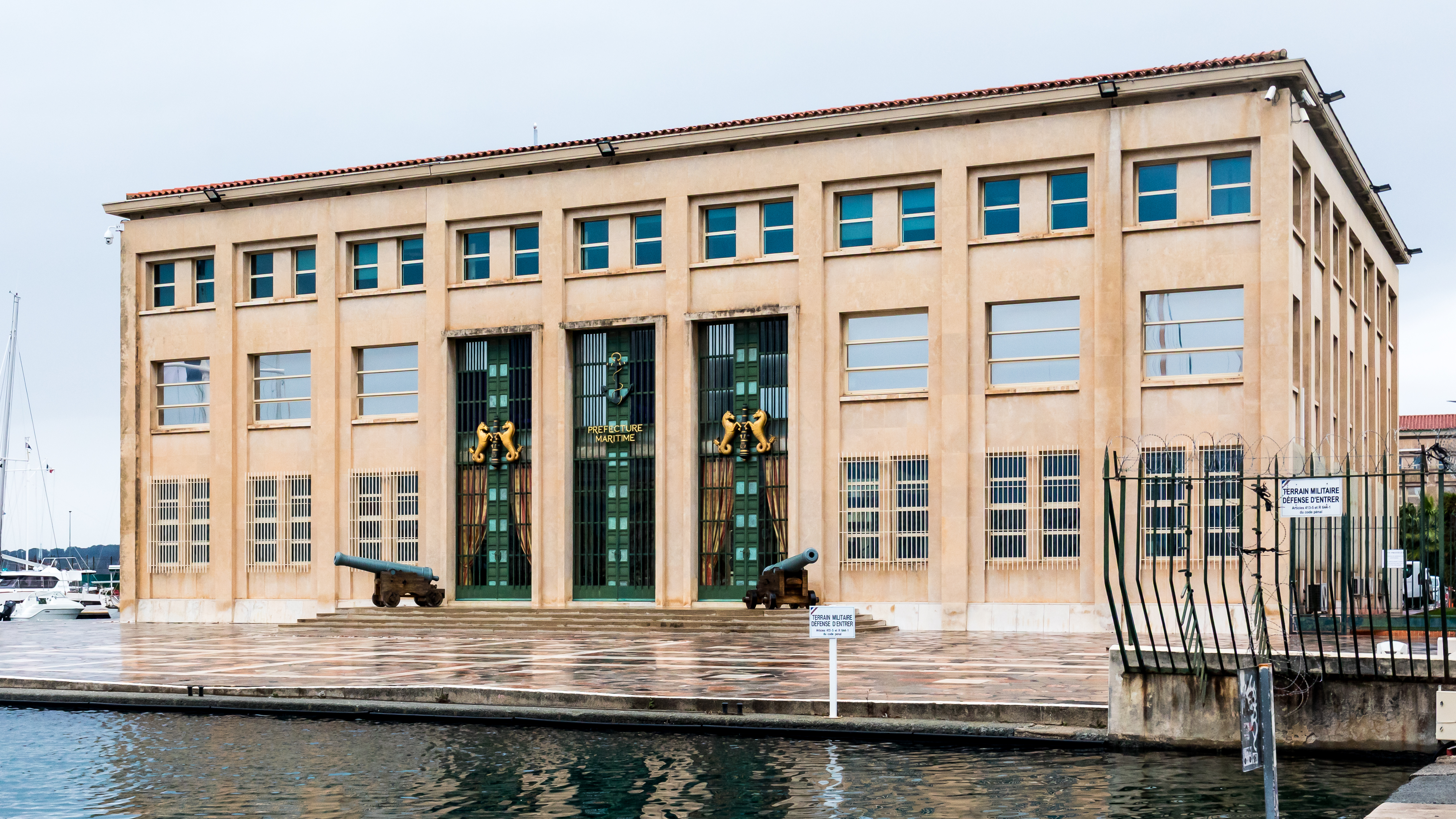
Préfecture maritime de Toulon

== Early years ==
Abrial started his career in 1896 at the École Navale, the French naval academy, taking his first post as an aspirant (midshipman) in 1898. During World War I, Abrial served in command of a high-seas patrol boat until 1917, when he joined the Naval Ministry's anti-submarine division. In 1920 he was promoted to Capitaine de frégate (Commander), first commanding the destroyer Commandant Bory and eventually an entire flotilla of destroyers stationed in the Mediterranean Sea.

== Promotions ==
After completing studies at the École Navale near the Atlantic-Coast port of Brest, he was promoted to Capitaine de vaisseau (Captain) in 1925, commanding the heavy cruiser Tourville in 1927–1929 and serving as commanding officer of the 1st Squadron at Toulon. In 1930 he was promoted to Rear Admiral and in 1936 to Vice Admiral, after which he commanded the Mediterranean squadron for three years. In 1939 he was charged with protecting French overseas trade as well as the north coast of France, and the following year General Maxime Weygand named him as Commander-in-Chief of the northern naval forces.

== World War II ==
Abrial worked in cooperation with the British troops during the evacuation of Dunkirk in 1940, even though he had not been informed of it prior to the operation. The operation began on 26 May with the requisitioning of several private boats in attempts to organize assistance from the French Navy. On 29 May the evacuation began; Abrial was one of the last to be evacuated. After evacuation, Abrial was based in Cherbourg — where, as senior officer, he was forced to surrender the port to the Germans on 19 June. From July 1940 to July 1941, he served Philippe Pétain's Vichy regime as the governor general of Algeria. Vichy regime President Pierre Laval appointed him as Naval Minister and commander of naval forces, a position he held from 29 November 1942 until 25 March 1943.

== Collaboration ==
On the downfall of the Vichy regime, Abrial was arrested and charged with collaboration, for which he lost his pension. After the Provisional Government of the French Republic re-established the Haute Cour de justice, that court condemned him for his Nazi collaboration and sentenced him to ten years of forced labor. In December 1947, however, he gained provisional release, and in 1954 he was granted amnesty.

== Honors and awards ==
- Officer of the Ordre National du Mérite
- Médaille Militaire
- Grand Cross of the Order of Legion of Honour

== Popular culture ==
In the 2004 BBC miniseries Dunkirk, Abrial was played by French actor André Oumansky.

== Bibliography ==
- Halpern, Paul G., ed. (2016). The Mediterranean Fleet, 1930–1939. Publications of the Navy Records Society. Vol. 163. London: Routledge for the Navy Records Society. ISBN 978-1-4724-7597-8.
- Taillemite, Étienne (1982). Dictionnaire des marins français (in French). Paris: Editions maritimes et d'Outre-Mer. OCLC 470113586.

Government offices
Preceded by Gabriel Auphan	Minister of Marine; 1942–1943	Succeeded by Henri Bléhaut
