= Albert Gicquel des Touches =

French Naval Officer

Albert Auguste Gicquel des Touches (10 April 1818 in Brest – 18 May 1901 in Versailles) was a French naval officer and author who served as Minister of the Navy from May to November of 1877.

== Biography ==
Gicquel des Touches joined the French Navy in 1832, serving on the Aspirant on 16 October 1833 and the Vessel Teaches on 1 May 1838. He served aboard the Juno, the Station Brazil, and La Plata from 1838 to 1841. Subsequently, Gicquel des Touches was aboard the Belle Poule, where he was known among his superiors for his hydrographic observations from 1842 to 1843.

Gicquel des Touches became a Lieutenant on 1 November 1843. He was later named Adjutant of Admiral Tréhouart aboard the Jupiter, the Friedland, and the Inflexible. He was promoted to Chief of Staff Admiral on Taenarus during the expedition to Rome in 1849. He was promoted to Captain on 9 August 1858. Gicquel des Touches became the new Chief of Staff of the Wing on Britain from 1860 to 1862, where he participated in the expedition to Syria. From 1862 to 1864, he commanded the gunnery school ship Montebello. In the more advanced stages of his career, he was named Maritime Prefect of the 3rd district to Lorient in November 1871, Vice Admiral on 3 August 1875, and eventually Minister for the Navy of France from May to November 1877.

In 1881, Gicquel des Touches worked as Director General of Deposit Maps and Navy Planes at the University of Paris. He also served as Chairman of the Hydrographic Committee and Vice-President of the Lighthouse Commission.

Gicquel des Touches left active duty in May 1884 and dedicated time in his retirement to charitable work for mariners.

== Writings ==
- Instructions on Admiral Tréhoüart (1798-1873), Paris, eldest Challamel 1874.
- Notice on transportation to French Guiana and New Caledonia during the years 1871-1872-1873-1874 & 1875, Paris, imp. nat 1877.
- The Truth about the military laws ... , Paris, Bloud and Barral, 1888.
- On Sunday at the Protestant nations, report by Vice Admiral Gicquel Marquis Des Touches, Paris, impr. F. Survey 1889.

== Sources ==
- Annuaires de la Marine 1860, 1869, 1881.
