= Alexandre Peyron =

French naval officer and politician

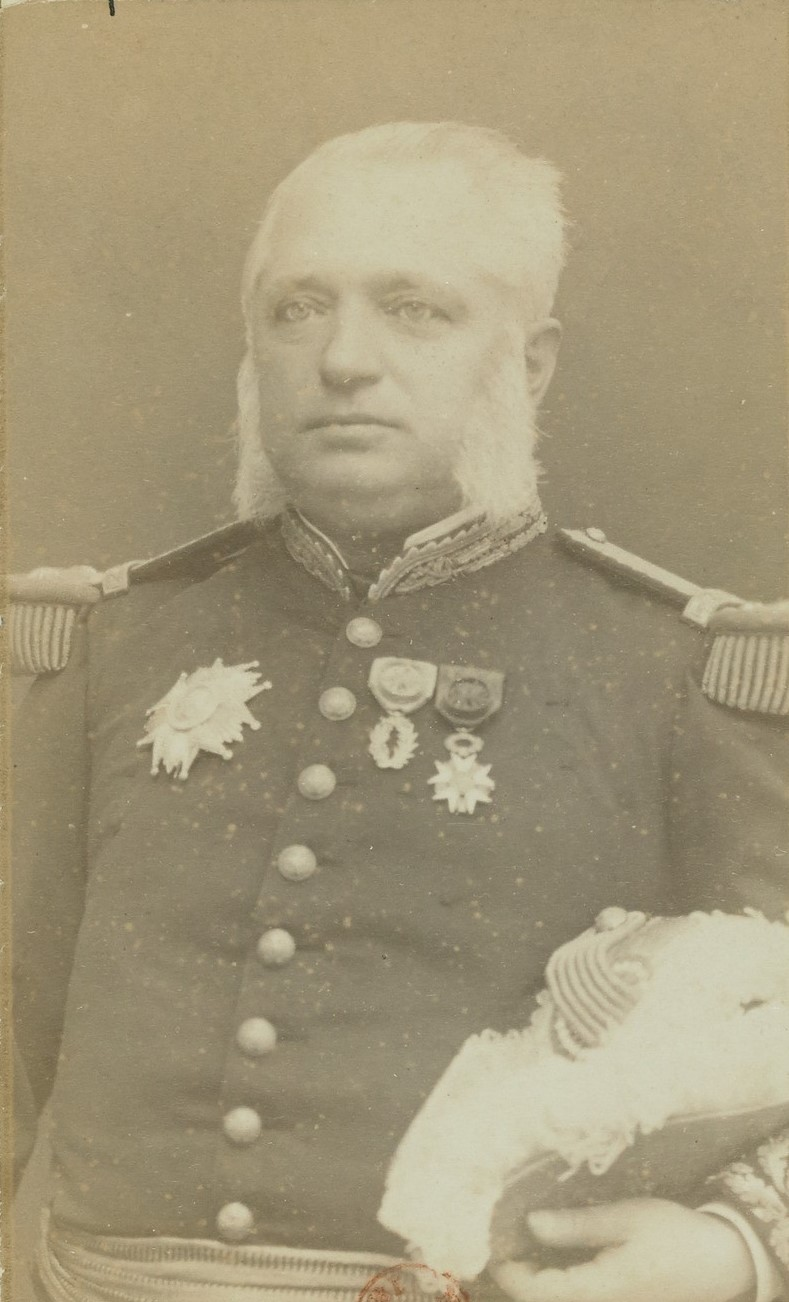

Alexandre Louis François Peyron (21 June 1823, in Marines, Val-d'Oise – 9 January 1892, in Paris) was a French naval officer and politician. He rose to vice admiral and served as Minister for the Navy and the Colonies from 1883 to 1885.

== Sources ==
- bio
