= Alphonse Gasnier-Duparc =

French politician

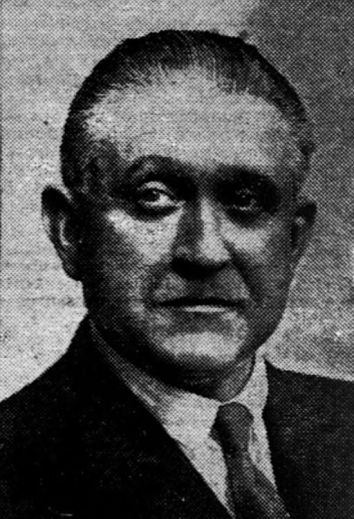
Portrait of Alphonse Gasnier-Duparc

Alphonse Henri Gasnier-Duparc (21 June 1879 in Dol-de-Bretagne – 10 October 1945 in Saint-Malo) was a French politician. He served as mayor of Saint-Malo, senator for Ille-et-Vilaine (1932–1940) and Naval Minister. He was a member of the Légion d'honneur, the Croix de Guerre, the Mérite maritime, the Mérite agricole and the Palmes académiques.

== Life ==
The son of Alphonse Charles and Anne Marie Antoinette Robidou, he studied in Saint-Malo then at the law faculty of the Université de Rennes before becoming a lawyer in Saint-Malo. In 1908, he was elected as a conseiller municipal of Saint-Malo; in 1910, as a conseiller d'arrondissement; in 1913, as a conseiller général; in 1930, as vice-president of the Conseil général, then as its president from 1935 to 1937. He became mayor of Saint-Malo on 19 May 1912 and held the post until 3 July 1941, when he was dismissed from the post by the occupying German forces. The town was destroyed during its liberation in late August and early September 1944 and in November 1944 he became president of the special delegation managing it.

At the senate elections on 12 June 1932, he was elected on the second ballot by 568 votes to 534, out of 1,103 voting. He was re-elected in the triennial elections on 12 January 1933, when he won by 563 votes to 549, out of 1,103 voting. He was a member of the radical-socialist party and aligned with the democratic left party, sitting in the senate until 1940. He was made Naval Minister in the first Blum ministry of the Popular Front, taking up the role on 4 June 1936, with M. Blancho as under-secretary of state for the navy. After that cabinet's fall in June 1937, he resumed his seat in the Senate. On 10 July 1940, he voted in favour of granting the cabinet presided by Marshal Philippe Pétain authority to draw up a new constitution, thereby effectively ending the French Third Republic and establishing Vichy France. On 23 January 1941, he was made a member of the National Council of Vichy France.

== Sources ==
- "Alphonse Gasnier-Duparc", in Dictionnaire des parlementaires français (1889-1940), Jean Jolly (ed.), PUF, 1960
- Biography on the Senat.fr site
