= Georges Charles Cloué =

French naval officer, colonial administrator and politician

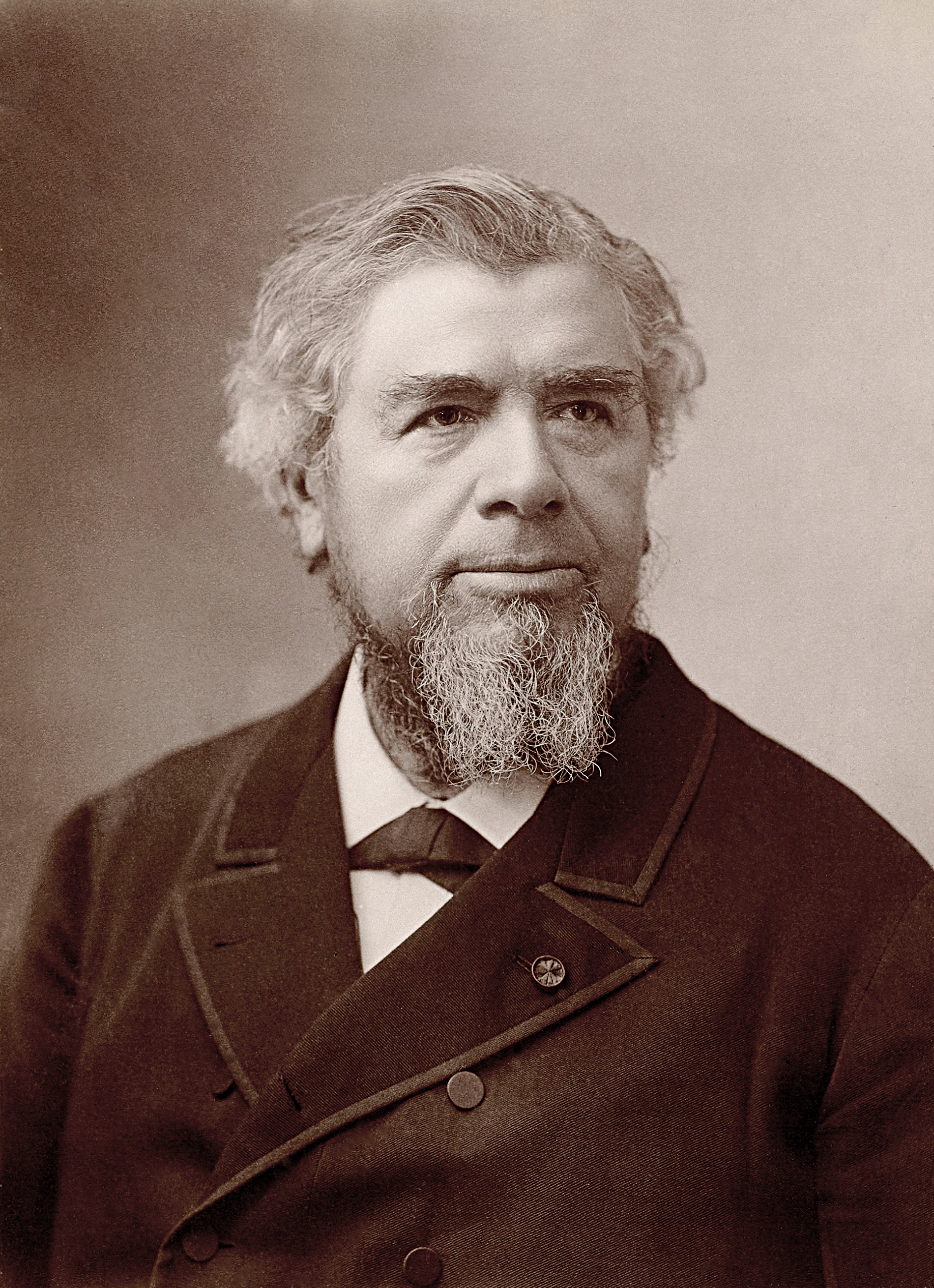
Cloué, c. 1875

Georges Charles Cloué (French pronunciation: [ʒɔʁʒ ʃaʁl klu.e]; 20 August 1817 in Paris – 25 December 1889 in Paris) was a French naval officer, colonial administrator and politician. He rose to the rank of vice admiral and took part in the French intervention in Mexico. He then became governor of Martinique from 30 August 1871 to 1874. He was Minister for the Navy and the Colonies from 23 September 1880 to 13 November 1881 in Jules Ferry's first ministry.

Rue de l'Amiral-Cloué in the 16th arrondissement of Paris is named after him.

== Sources ==
- http://www.ucs.mun.ca/~mwilks/trefeu3.htm
