= Émile Chautemps =

French politician

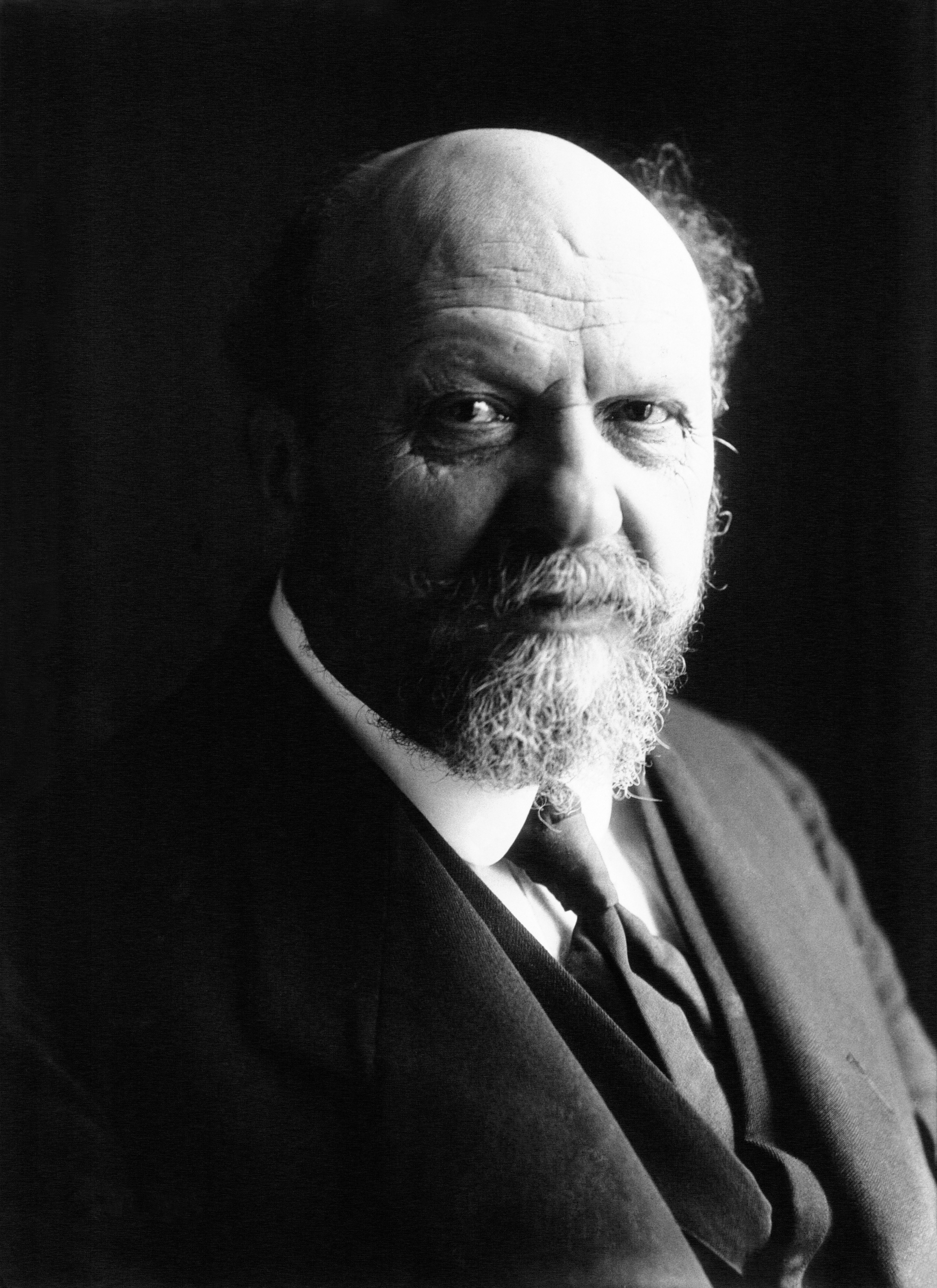
Émile Chautemps in 1914

Émile Chautemps (2 May 1850, in Valleiry, then in the Kingdom of Sardinia – 10 December 1918, in Paris) was a French politician.

== Life and career ==
He was Minister of the Colonies from January to November 1895 and Minister of the Navy in June 1914.

== Family ==
His eldest son, Henry, was killed in Senegal in 1904 while helping to arrest a killer. Two other sons were killed during the First World War while a third was severely wounded. Another son, Camille Chautemps, was Prime Minister of France on three occasions.

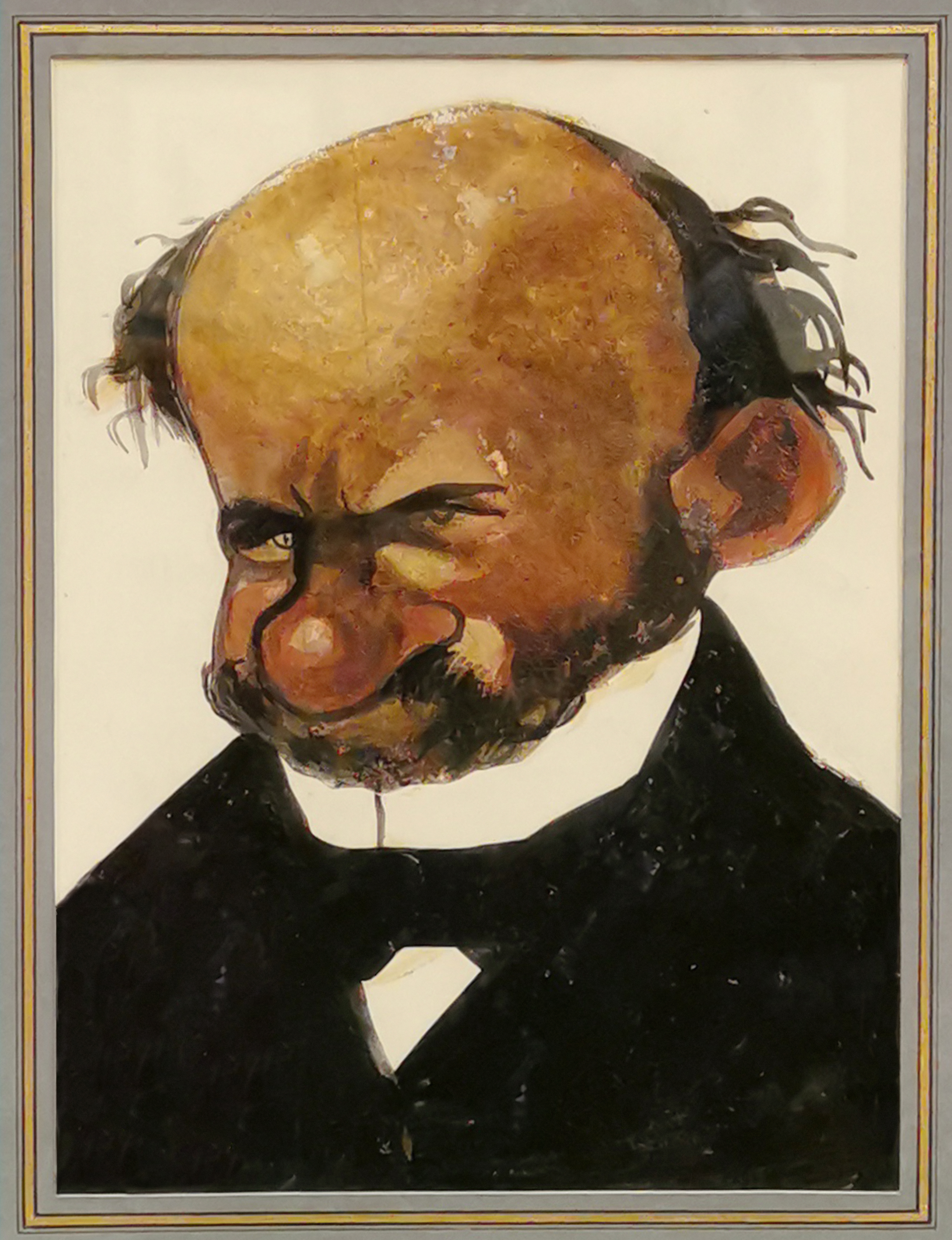
Portrait by Tomás Leal da Câmara

== Sources ==
- http://www.assemblee-nationale.fr/sycomore/fiche.asp?num_dept=1727
