= Gustave Besnard =

French admiral and Ministre de la Marine

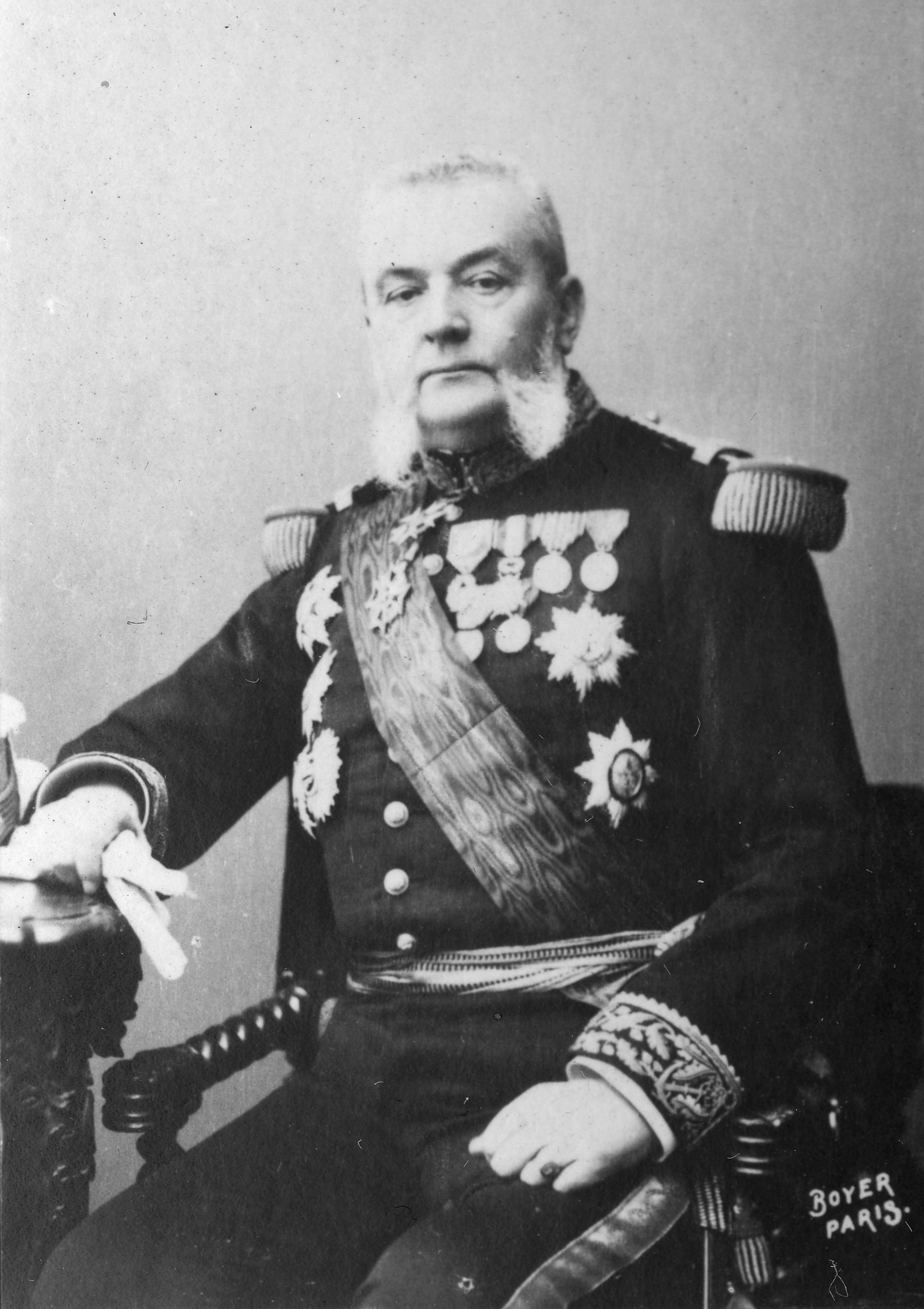
- Vice-amiral Besnard
- Born: 11 October 1833; Rambouillet, France
- Died: 15 July 1903 (aged 69) Château du Rohu, Lorient, France
- Allegiance: France
- Branch: Navy
- Service years: 1849–1898
- Rank: Vice-amiral
- Conflicts: Second Opium War; Cochinchina campaign; Franco-Prussian War
- Awards: Grand officier de la Légion d'Honneur
- Other work: Ministre de la Marine

Gustave Besnard (French pronunciation: [ɡystav benaʁ]; 11 October 1833, Rambouillet – 15 July 1903, Château du Rohu near Lorient) was a French admiral and Ministre de la Marine.

== Biography ==
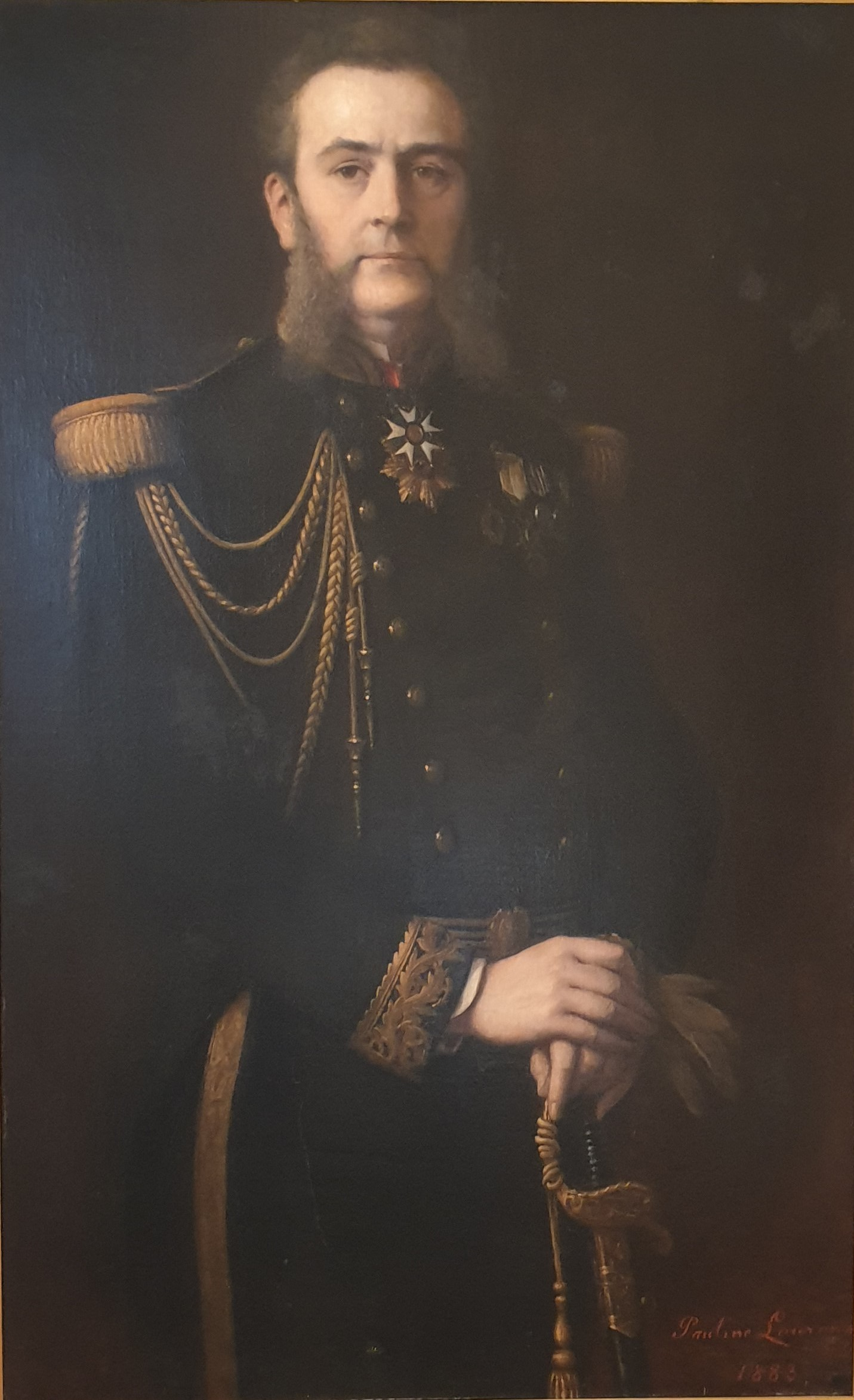
Portrait of Navy Captain Gustave Besnard, drawn by Pauline Laurens in 1883

From the time he joined the French Navy as a cadet at the École Navale in 1849, until his retirement date in 1898, Besnard served 50 years in the French Navy. After graduating from the École Navale in 1852, Besnard progressed rapidly in rank and commanded twelve warships (frigates, light cruisers, heavy cruisers) between 1867 and 1892, in all parts of the world (Mediterranean, North Atlantic, South Atlantic, Indochina, China). He held a number of prestigious shore positions such as Chief of Staff to the Minister of the Navy (1881), Head of Navy Personnel (1887–1889), Préfet Maritime de Brest (1893–1895). After this long and distinguished career in the French Navy, Besnard served as Ministre de la Marine, the French equivalent of First Lord of the Admiralty, between 1895 and 1898.

In this position of Ministre de la Marine, Besnard was responsible for the overall strategic direction of the French Navy. He directed naval support for the conquest of Madagascar (1895). He secured from Parliament the necessary credits to keep the fleets of the French Navy at operational strength and at immediate readiness. He won Parliament approval for setting up overseas Navy bases and strongpoints in many parts of the world: in particular the arsenal of Bizerte (Tunisia).

During Besnard's time as Ministre de la Marine, there are two schools of thought: the young school - Jeune École - is in favor of a fleet with a lot of light units such as torpedo boats. The opposite theory emphasizes that sea power is based on the large ships which decide battles, such as big-gun battleships.

Besnard was clearly in favor of the latter theory. Speaking on the occasion of budget debates at the French Parliament between 1895 and 1898, Admiral Besnard pushed forward naval armaments programs in which battleships and cruisers represented over 80% of total funds. He confined torpedo boats to their normal role in coast defense.

== Sources ==
- Vice-amiral Charles Touchard, Notice sur la carrière du Vice-amiral Besnard, Paris, Imprimerie E. Desfossés, 1923, 10 pages
- Archives Nationales, Base LEONORE, Cote LH/221/57
- Service Historique de la Défense, Marine Vincennes, Cote 87 GG2
- Service historique de la Défense, Marine Vincennes, dossier individuel du Vice-amiral Armand Louis Charles Gustave Besnard, cote CC7 2e Moderne 12-4
- Félix Faure, Journal à l'Élysée (1895-1899), Paris, Éditions des Équateurs, 2009, page 333
- Frédéric Saffroy, « Clémenceau et la stratégie navale - le torpilleur contre le cuirassé », Cols Bleus Marine Nationale, 1er juin 2018
- Journal Officiel de la République Française, Lois et décrets, 30 mars 1897, Tableau des constructions neuves annexé à la Loi de finances du 29 mars 1897, pages 1888–1912.
