= Albert Roussin =

French vice-admiral and politician

- Born: August 2, 1821; Brest
- Died: September 2, 1896 (aged 75); Paris
- Relatives: Albin Roussin
- Military career
- Allegiance: France
- Rank: Vice-admiral

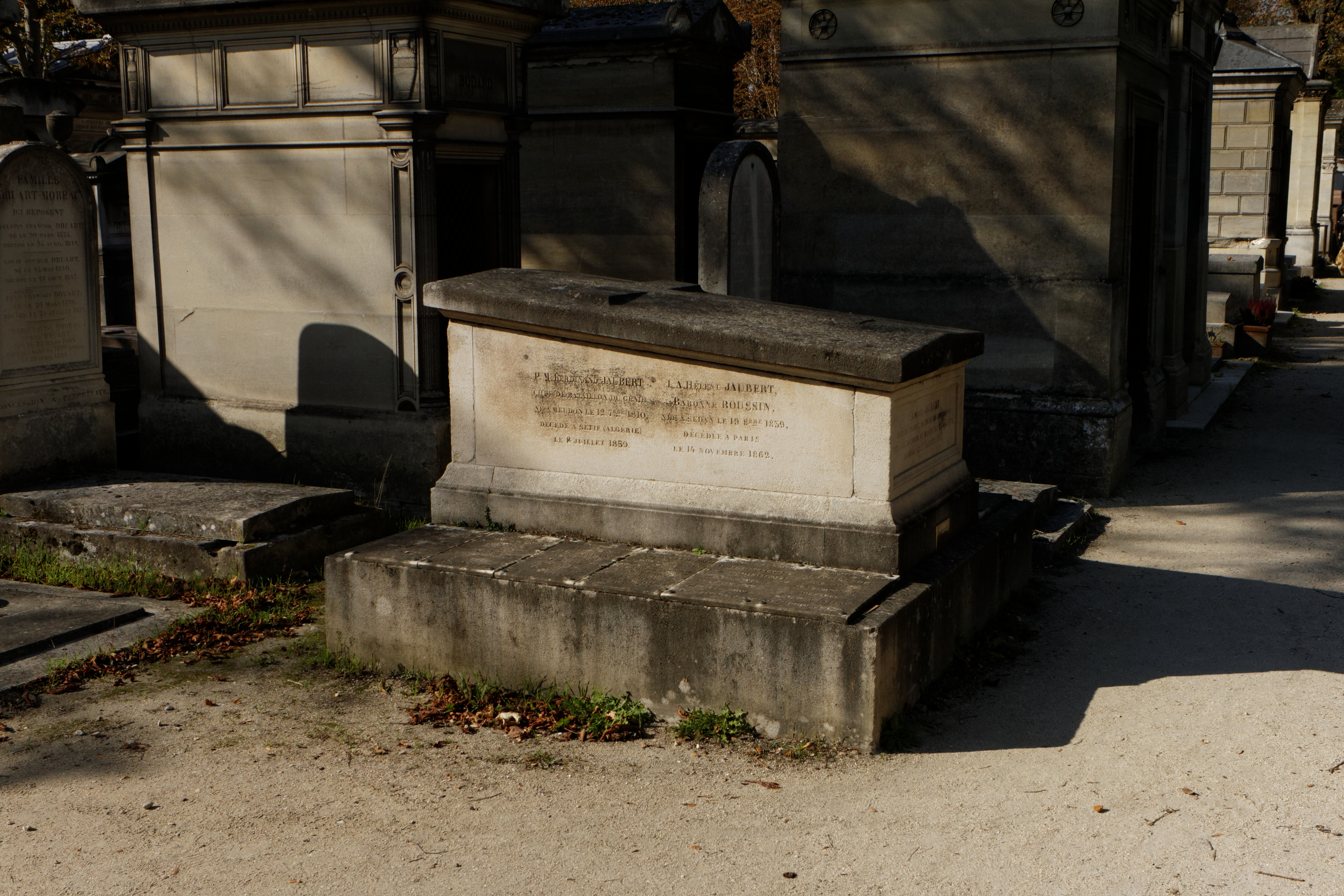

Albert Edmond Louis Roussin, baron (2 August 1821, Brest – 28 September 1896, Paris) was a French vice-admiral and politician. He was first commissioned captain in 1859. He was Naval Minister from 23 November to 12 December 1877. He was the son of Albin Roussin.
