= Victor Auguste, baron Duperré =

French naval commander

Governor of Gabon
- In office 1869–1870
- Monarch: Napoleon III
- Preceded by: Alexandre François Dauriac
- Succeeded by: Siméon Bourgois

Governor of Cochinchina
- In office 30 November 1874 – 16 October 1877
- President: Patrice de MacMahon
- Preceded by: Jules François Émile Krantz
- Succeeded by: Louis Charles Georges Jules Lafont

Personal details
- Born: 4 August 1825 Paris, France
- Died: 26 March 1900 (aged 74)
- Occupation: Naval officer

Victor Auguste Duperré (4 August 1825 – 26 March 1900) was a French naval commander.

He was born in Paris, and served as Commander of the Naval Division of the Western Coasts of Africa, effectively Colonial head of Gabon ("Colony of Gorée and Dependencies") between 1869 and 1870. He later became governor of Cochinchina (1874–1877).
