= Jean Marie Antoine de Lanessan =

Governor-general of French Indochina (1843–1919)

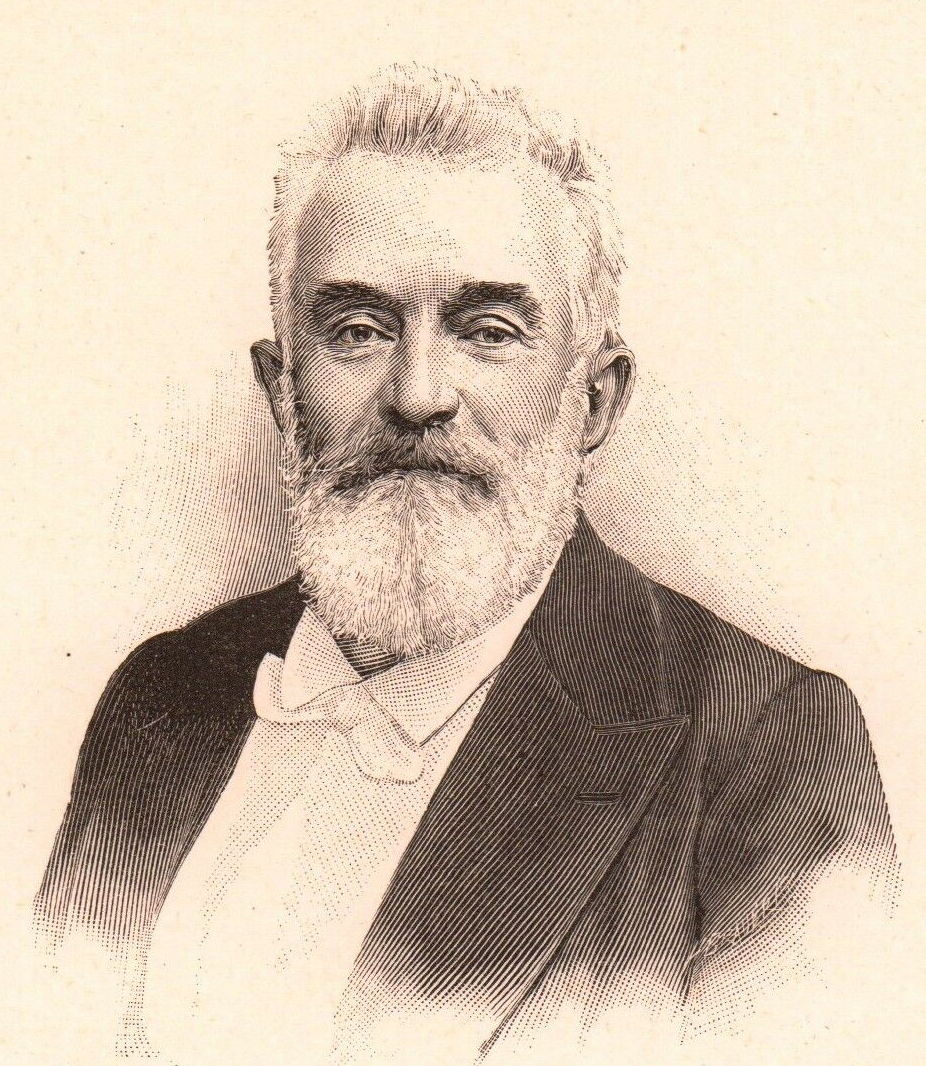
Jean Marie Antoine de Lanessan.

Jean Marie Antoine Louis de Lanessan (13 July 1843 – 7 November 1919) was a French statesman and naturalist.

== Biography ==
De Lanessan was born in Saint-André-de-Cubzac in the Gironde department of France and entered the French Navy in 1862, serving on the East African and Cochin-China stations in the medical department until the Franco-Prussian War, when he resigned and volunteered for the army medical service. He then completed his studies, taking his doctorate in 1872.

Elected to the Municipal Council of Paris in 1879, de Lanessan declared in favor of communal autonomy and joined with Henri Rochefort in demanding the erection of a monument to the Communards; but after his election to the Chamber of Deputies for the 5th arrondissement of Paris in 1881 he gradually veered from the extreme Radical party to the Republican Union, and identified himself with the cause of colonial expansion.

A government mission to the French colonies in 1886-1887, in connection with the approaching Paris exhibition, gave him the opportunity of studying colonial questions, on which, after his return, he published three works: La Tunisie (Paris, 1887); L'Expansion coloniale de la France (Paris, 1888), L'Indo-Chine francaise (Paris, 1889). In 1891 he was made civil and military governor of French Indochina, where his administration, which led to open rupture with Admiral Fournier, was severely criticized. Nevertheless, he consolidated French influence in Annam and Cambodia, and secured a large accession of territory on the Mekong River from the kingdom of Siam. He was recalled in 1894, and published a justification of his administration (La Colonisation française en Indo-Chine) in the following year.

In the Waldeck-Rousseau cabinet of 1899 to 1902 he was Minister of Marine, and in 1901 he secured the passage of a naval programme intended to raise the French navy during the next six years to a level befitting the place of France among the great powers. At the general elections of 1906 and 1914 he was not re-elected, and retired from politics. He was political director of Le Siècle, and president of the French Colonization Society, and he wrote, besides the books already mentioned, various works on political and biological questions. He died at Écouen, then in Seine-et-Oise.

De Lanessan was an advocate of neo-Lamarckian evolution.
