= Montebello (ship) =

- French ship Montebello (1812), a 118-gun ship of the line of the French Navy
- Montebello (schooner), an 1890~1910 ship, renamed Barceló, 1910~1929,
- SS Montebello, an oil tanker of the Second World War
- Montebello (1900), a French merchant ship built 1900 and wrecked off Kangaroo Island in South Australia in 1906.
