= Jacques-Louis Dumesnil =

French politician

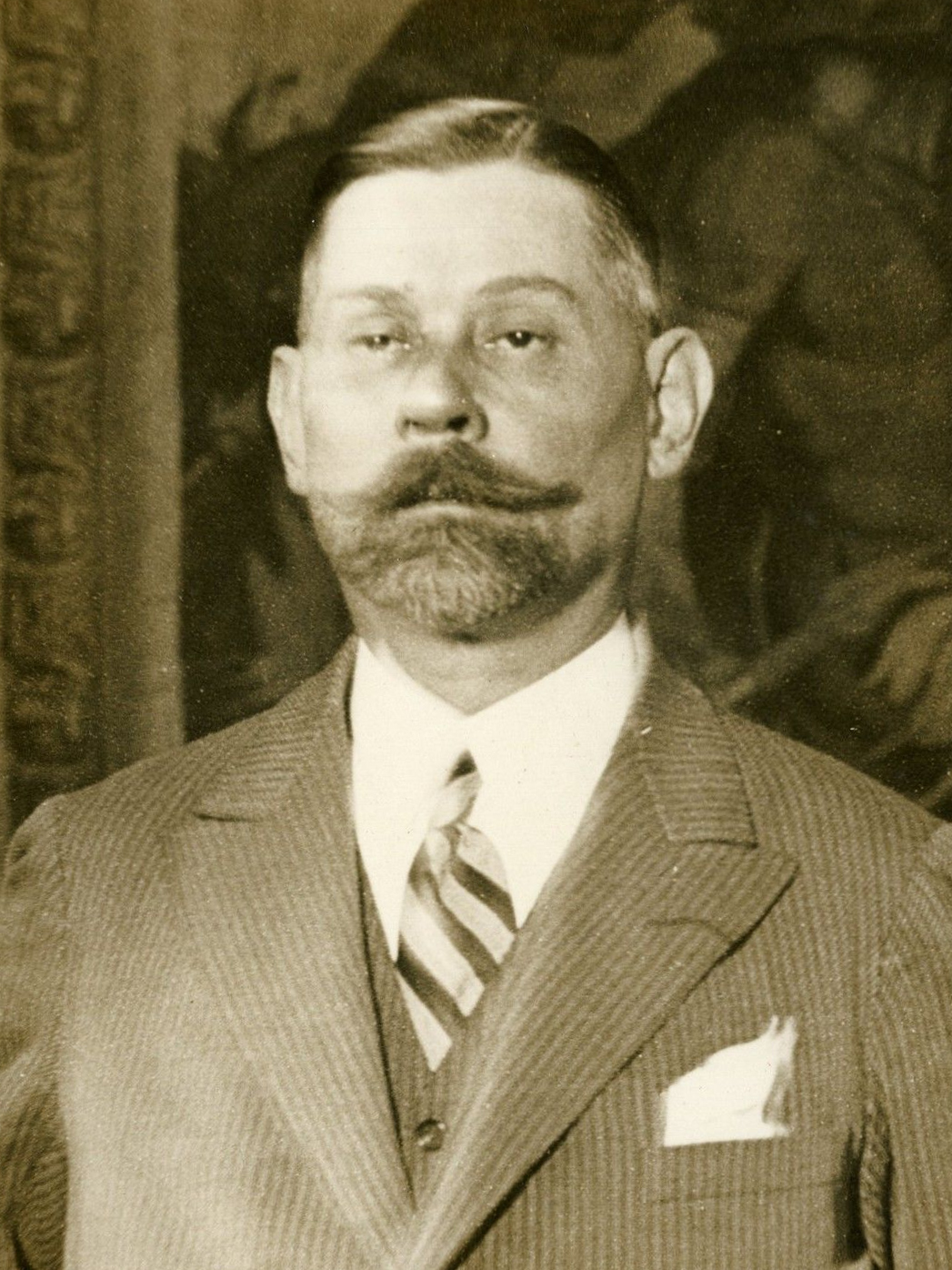
Dumesnil in 1932

Jacques-Louis Dumesnil (French pronunciation: [ʒak lwi dymenil]; 15 March 1882, in Paris – 15 June 1956, in Paris) was a French politician. He served as Minister of Air from 1931 to 1932 representing Republican, Radical and Radical-Socialist Party.

== Life ==
From an old Seine-et-Marne family, he initially worked as a journalist and lawyer at the Cour de Paris. He was elected a conseiller général for Seine-et-Marne aged 25 and a radical deputy for Seine-et-Marne aged 28 in 1910. He was re-elected in 1914 and remained in post until 1935.

He was mobilised for the First World War as a sous-lieutenant. During the course of the conflict he rose to lieutenant then captain, was wounded at the First Battle of the Marne and won the Légion d'honneur and the Croix de Guerre.
