= Charles de Dompierre d'Hornoy =

French politician, admiral, and naval minister

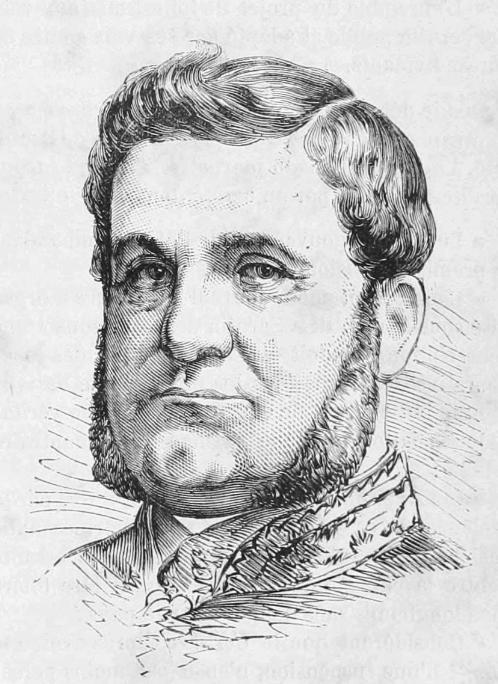

Charles de Dompierre d'Hornoy (French pronunciation: [ʃaʁl də dɔ̃pjɛʁ dɔʁnwa]; 24 February 1816, in Hornoy-le-Bourg – 21 March 1901, in Paris) was a French admiral, politician and naval minister.
