= Louis Raymond de Montaignac de Chauvance =

French naval officer and politician

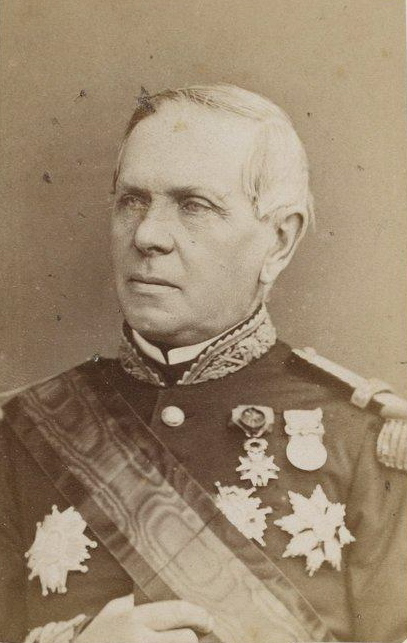

Louis Raymond, marquis de Montaignac de Chauvance (11 March 1811, Paris – 9 June 1891, Paris) was a French naval officer and politician. He served as naval minister from 1874 to 1876.

== Sources ==
- « Louis Raymond de Montaignac de Chauvance », in Robert and Cougny, Dictionnaire des parlementaires français, 1889
