= Édouard Barbey =

French politician

Edouard Barbey (2 September 1831, Béziers – 26 March 1905, Paris) was a French politician. He also served in the French Navy from 1849 to 1862, leaving with the rank of lieutenant. He was also French Naval Minister in 1887 and from 1889 to 1892.

== Sources ==
- http://www.senat.fr/senateur-3eme-republique/barbey_edouard1693r3.html
