= Alfred Picard =

German footballer

Personal information
- Date of birth: 21 March 1913
- Place of birth: Dietersheim, German Empire
- Date of death: 12 April 1945 (aged 32)
- Place of death: Cloppenburg, Nazi Germany
- Position: Defender

Senior career*
Years	Team	Apps	(Gls)
- TSG Ulm 1846

International career
1939	Germany	1	(0)
- * Club domestic league appearances and goals

Alfred Picard (21 March 1913 – 12 April 1945) was a German international footballer.

== Personal life ==
Picard served as a leutnant (lieutenant) in the German Army during the Second World War and was killed in action on 12 April 1945. He is buried at Cloppenburg war cemetery.
