= Charles Chaumet =

French politician (1866–1932)

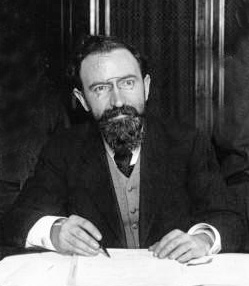
Chaumet in 1911 as under-secretary for state for Post, Telegraph and Telephones.

Jean Charles Joseph Chaumet (21 February 1866, in Prignac-et-Marcamps – 7 January 1932, in Paris) was a French politician and republican militant. He is notable as one of the founders of radicalism.
