= Armand Gauthier =

French politician

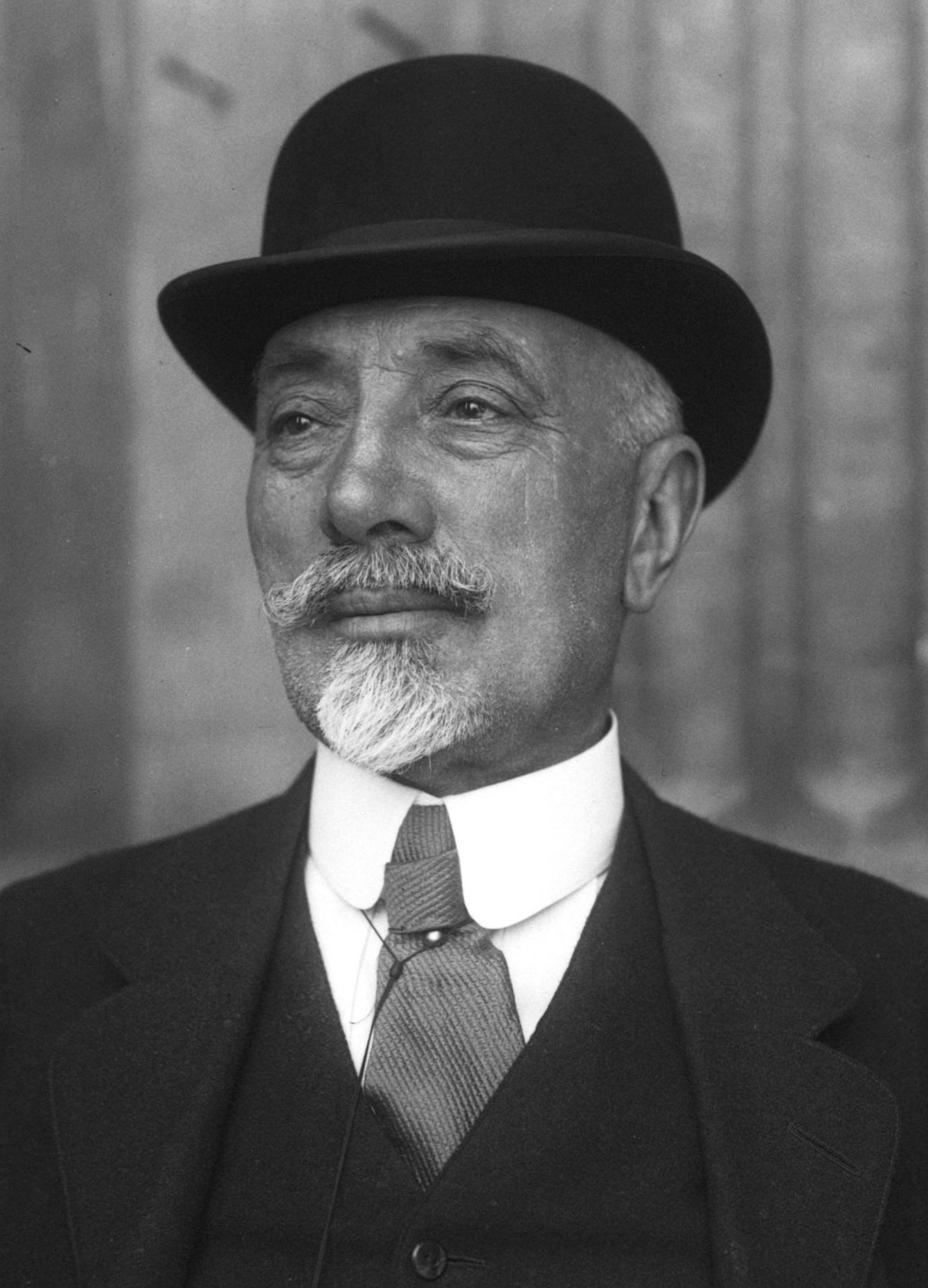
Armand Gauthier in 1914

Armand-Elzéar Gauthier de l'Aude (28 September 1850, Fitou – 10 May 1926, Paris) was a French politician. He was also known as Elzéar Gauthier.

In 1886, he was elected to the General Council of the Aude, where he represented the canton of Sigean for 40 years, holding the Presidency of the Council from 1901 to 1902, 1905 to 1906, and 1908 to 1921. In 1894, he was elected Senator of Aude, and held the position until 1926. He was a member of the Democratic Left.

In the Rouvier Ministry he became Minister of Public Works, then Minister of the Navy in the first Doumergue ministry from 20 March to 3 June 1914, and again in the first Viviani Cabinet, from 13 June to 3 August 1914.

In the fraught atmosphere of the Crisis he forgot to deploy torpedo boats into the English Channel. He then quarreled with War Minister Adolphe Messimy, who was keen to use the Navy to bring the Colonial Corps from North Africa to France. Gauthier wanted to redeem his reputation by using the French Navy to attack the German warships Goeben and Breslau, currently in the Mediterranean, before Germany and France were actually at war. He challenged Messimy to a duel on 2 August, but eventually embraced him tearfully and was persuaded to resign on grounds of health on 3 August, the day of the declaration of war of Germany on France.

== Sources ==
- Tuchman, Barbara (1962). The Guns of August. Random House. ISBN 978-0345476098.
- "Armand Gauthier", in Dictionnaire des parlementaires français (1889-1940), Jean Jolly (ed.), PUF, 1960
