= François de Mahy =

French politician (1830–1906)

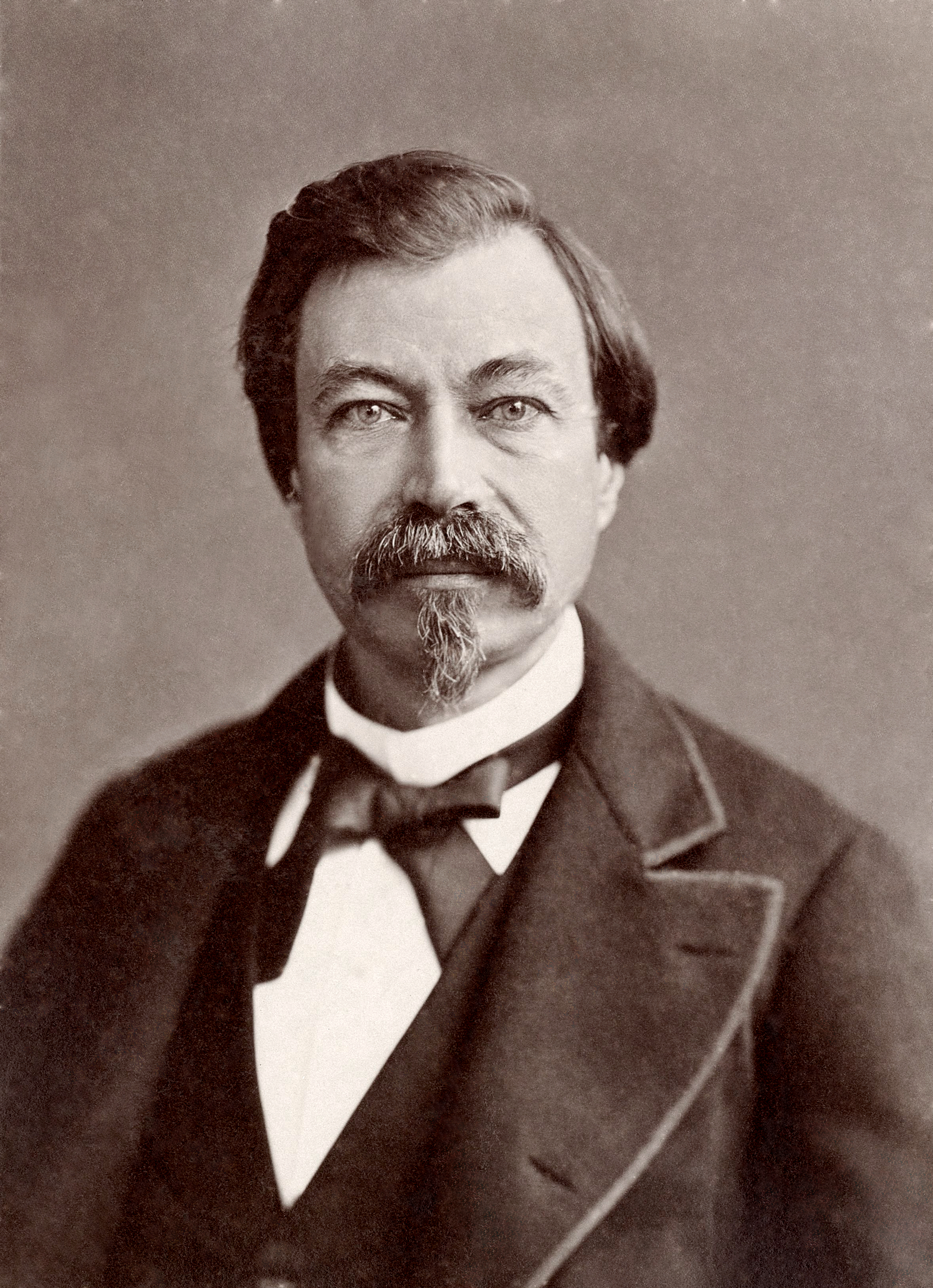

François Césaire de Mahy (22 July 1830 – 19 November 1906 was a French politician.

== Biography ==
He was born in Saint-Pierre into a family of notables whose father was elected mayor of the city in 1841. The young François first went to college in Saint-Denis before continuing his studies at the Lycée Henri-IV in Paris. He did not return to his native town until 1857, two years after obtaining his doctorate in medicine. The contact with his numerous patients gave him a vocation for politics which led him to plan to leave for the capital.

A tropical cyclone leads him to cancel his project and to get involved locally. He started his career in journalism, precisely at the Courrier de Saint-Pierre. He soon developed with Alexandre Robinet de La Serve a project of colonial reform which would lead to the legislative assimilation of the island to the metropolis. When the Third Republic was proclaimed and two seats of deputies were granted to Reunion, he finally presented himself as a Republican candidate, like his friend. They were largely elected on 20 November 1870. He was a member of the National Assembly until his death during his mandate. In May 1877, he was one of the 363 deputies who opposed the de Broglie government. Throughout this time, he showed a pronounced anti-clericalism, even if he voted against the separation of the Churches and the State in 1905. He died in Paris, aged 76.
