= Henri Maurice Berteaux =

French politician

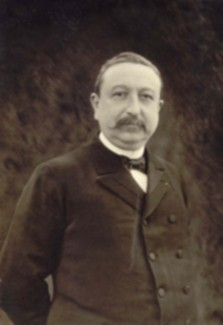

Minister of War
- In office 15 November 1904 – 12 November 1905
- President: Émile Loubet
- Preceded by: Louis André
- Succeeded by: Eugène Étienne
- In office 2 March 1911 – 27 May 1911
- President: Armand Fallières
- Preceded by: Aristide Briand (interim)
- Succeeded by: François Goiran

Personal details
- Born: June 3, 1852 Saint-Maur-des-Fossés, Val-de-Marne, France
- Died: May 21, 1911 (aged 58) Issy-les-Moulineaux, Hauts-de-Seine, France
- Party: Radical Party

Henri Maurice Berteaux (3 June 1852 – 21 May 1911) was the Minister of War in France from November 1904 to November 1905, and from 2 March 1911 until his accidental death on 21 May 1911.

== Biography ==
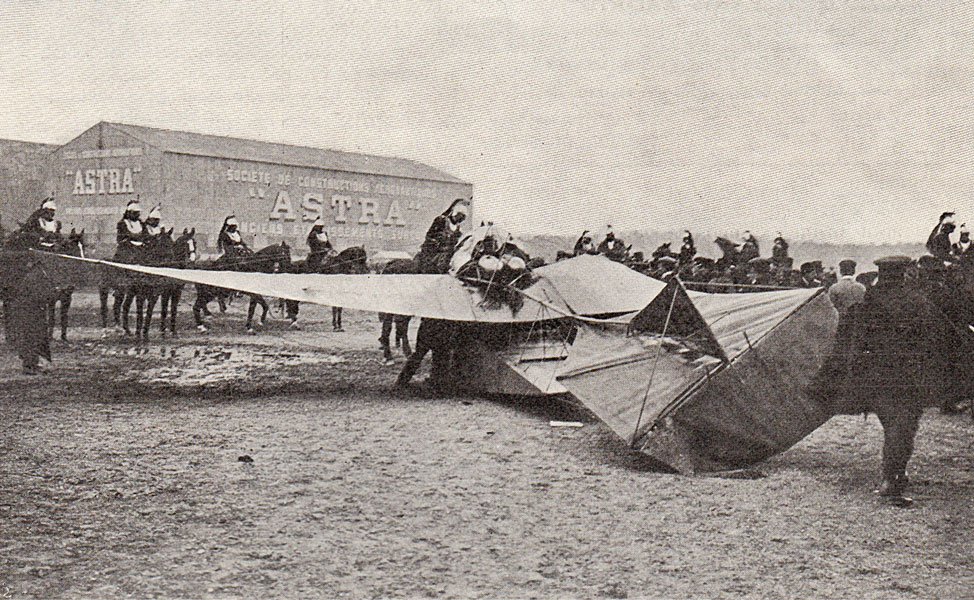
Train monoplane after crash

Berteaux was born at Saint-Maur-des-Fossés, in Seine, now Val-de-Marne. Elected as a Radical-Socialist deputy in 1893, he became the leader of the party's most left-wing faction.

During his second term of office, Berteaux devoted himself to the reform of the French army service uniform, which included red trousers (pantalon rouge) and blue coats for the majority of regiments, as well as other traditional features such as plumed helmets and cuirasses for the heavy cavalry. Berteaux, convinced that such conspicuous dress was unsuitable for modern warfare, promoted the adoption of a grey-green replacement known as la tenue reseda. This project was opposed by Berteaux's political opponents, who argued that the new uniform was both ugly and too similar to the field grey service dress just adopted by the Imperial German army. His sudden death led to the abandonment of the reseda project and the French Army entered World War I in August 1914 still wearing colourful and impractical peacetime uniforms.

Berteaux was accidentally killed on 21 May 1911 at the start of the 1911 Paris to Madrid air race, when a monoplane piloted by Louis Émile Train made a forced landing, running into a group of people including Berteaux, the oil tycoon Henri Deutsch de la Meurthe, the French Prime Minister Ernest Monis, and his son, all of whom were also injured. Berteaux lost an arm and sustained a fatal head injury. His funeral was held on 26 May 1911.
