= Théophile Delcassé =

French statesman (1852–1923)

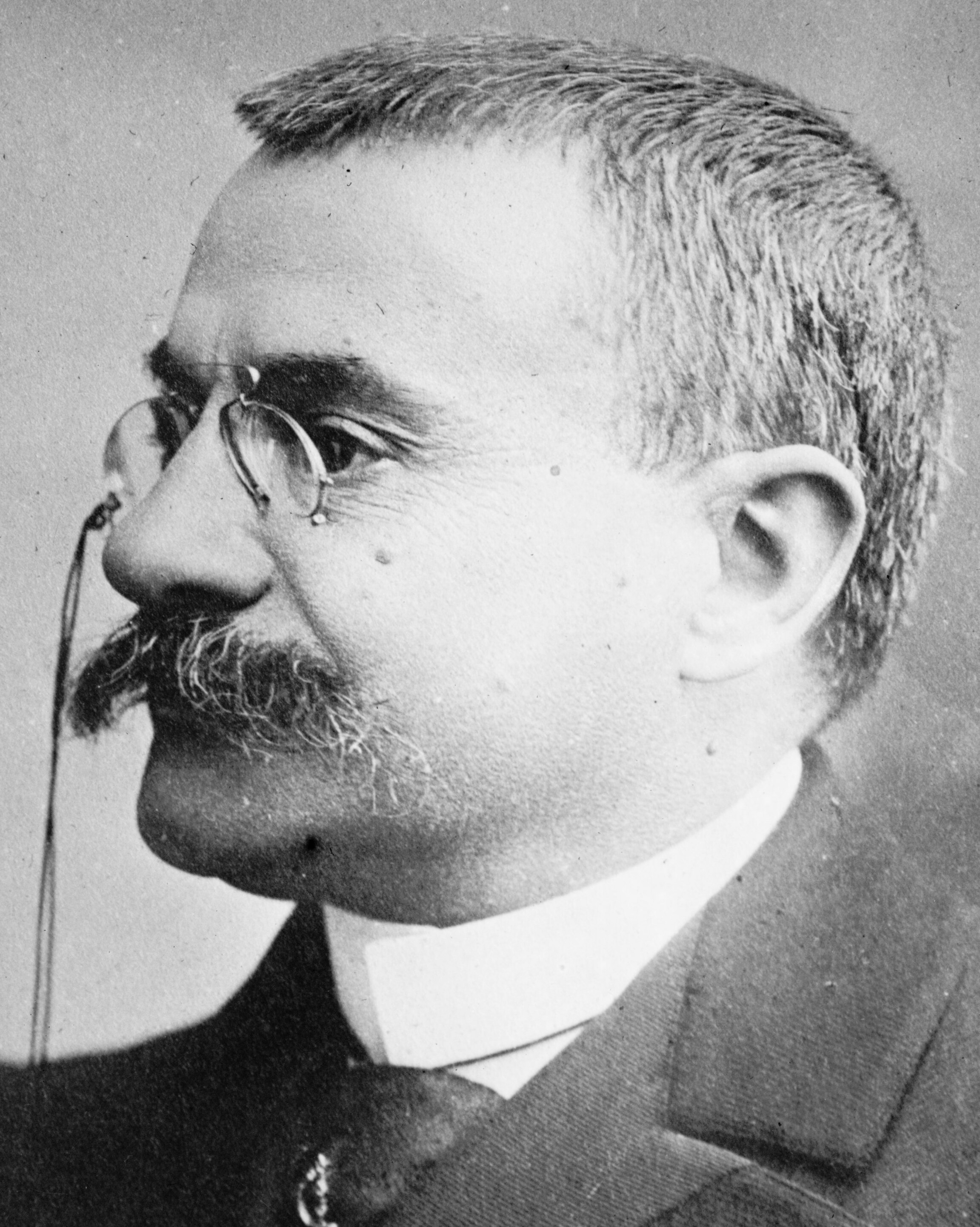

Minister of Foreign Affairs
- In office 28 June 1898 – 6 June 1905
- President: Félix Faure; Émile Loubet
- Prime Minister: Henri Brisson; Charles Dupuy; Pierre Waldeck-Rousseau; Émile Combes; Maurice Rouvier
- Preceded by: Gabriel Hanotaux
- Succeeded by: Maurice Rouvier
- In office 26 August 1914 – 13 October 1915
- President: Raymond Poincaré
- Prime Minister: René Viviani
- Preceded by: Gaston Doumergue
- Succeeded by: René Viviani

Minister of War
- In office 9 June 1914 – 13 June 1914
- President: Raymond Poincaré
- Prime Minister: Alexandre Ribot
- Preceded by: Joseph Noulens
- Succeeded by: Adolphe Messimy

Minister of Marine
- In office 2 March 1911 – 21 January 1913
- President: Armand Fallières
- Prime Minister: Ernest Monis; Joseph Caillaux; Raymond Poincaré
- Preceded by: Auguste Boué de Lapeyrère
- Succeeded by: Pierre Baudin

Minister of Colonies
- In office 30 May 1894 – 26 January 1895
- President: Sadi Carnot; Jean Casimir-Périer; Félix Faure
- Prime Minister: Charles Dupuy
- Preceded by: Ernest Boulanger
- Succeeded by: Émile Chautemps

Under-secretary of state for Colonies
- In office 18 January 1893 – 25 November 1893
- President: Sadi Carnot
- Prime Minister: Alexandre Ribot; Charles Dupuy
- Preceded by: Émile Jamais
- Succeeded by: Maurice Lebon

Membre of the Chamber of Deputies
- In office 12 November 1889 – 7 December 1919
- Preceded by: Charles Sans-Leroy
- Succeeded by: Roger Lafagette
- Parliamentary group: Radical Left
- Constituency: Ariège

Personal details
- Born: 1 March 1852 Pamiers, Ariège, France
- Died: 22 February 1923 (aged 70) Nice, Alpes-Maritimes, France
- Party: Radical

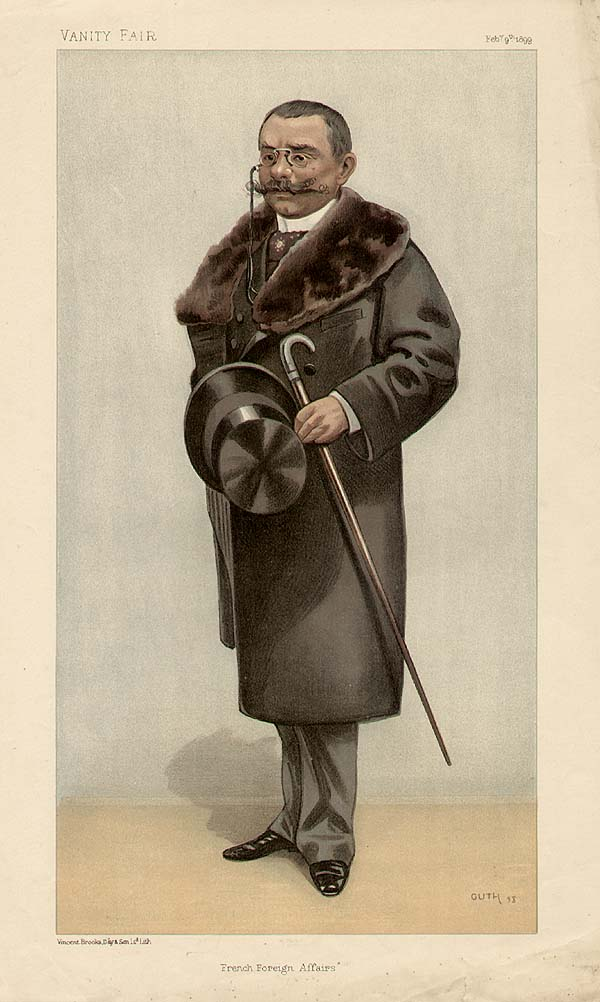
Delcassé caricatured by Guth for Vanity Fair, 1899

Théophile Delcassé (French: [teɔfil dɛlkase]; 1 March 1852 – 22 February 1923) was a French politician who served as foreign minister from 1898 to 1905. He is best known for his hatred of Germany and efforts to secure alliances with Russia and the United Kingdom that became the Entente Cordiale. He belonged to the Radical Party and was a protege of Léon Gambetta.

== Biography ==
Delcassé was born on 1 March 1852, at Pamiers, in the Ariège département. He wrote articles on foreign affairs for the République Française and Le Temps, and in 1888 was elected conseiller général of his native département, standing as "un disciple fidèle de Léon Gambetta". In the following year he entered the chamber as deputy for Foix.

=== Colonial affairs ===
Delcassé was appointed under-secretary for the colonies in the second Ribot cabinet (January to April 1893), and retained his post in the Dupuy cabinet till its fall in December 1893. During this period he would push strongly for the independence of the undersecretariat, beginning with the demand that it be transferred out of the backrooms of the Ministry of the Navy, to a separate building in the Pavillon de Flore - this physical separation helped ensure it would become relatively free from naval control. Drawing upon the previous work of Faure and Etienne, he would also campaign vigorously for the establishment of a separate ministry devoted to the matter, with Faure likening his force of personality and resistance to ministerial control to that of Julius Caesar. Backed up by the resignation of the following undersecretary Maurice Lebon, he was able to speak forcefully in favor of the establishment of a Ministry, and it was largely owing to his efforts that the French colonial office was made a separate department with a minister at its head thanks to a passing of a bill by 260 votes to 239. To this office he was appointed, in the second Dupuy cabinet (May 1894 to January 1895).

He gave a great impetus to French colonial enterprise, especially in West Africa, where he organized the newly acquired colony of Dahomey, and despatched the Liotard mission to the upper Ubangi. While in opposition, Delcassé devoted special attention to naval affairs, and in noted speeches he declared that the function of the French navy was to secure and develop colonial enterprise, deprecated all attempts to rival the British fleet, and advocated the construction of commerce destroyers as France's best reply to England.

=== Foreign minister ===
On the formation of the second Brisson cabinet in June 1898 he succeeded Gabriel Hanotaux as Foreign Minister, and retained that post under the subsequent premierships of Dupuy, Waldeck-Rousseau, Combes and Rouvier. In 1898 Delcassé had to deal with the delicate situation caused by Captain Marchand's occupation of the town of Fashoda in the Sudan (the Fashoda Incident) for which, as he admitted in a speech in the chamber on 23 January 1899, he accepted full responsibility, since it arose directly out of the Liotard expedition; and in March 1899 he concluded an agreement with Britain by which the difficulty was finally adjusted, and France consolidated her vast colonial empire in North-West Africa. In the same year he acted as mediator (the main mediator being Jules Cambon, French ambassador in Washington) between the United States of America and Spain, and brought the peace negotiations to a successful conclusion.

Delcassé was originally a moderate willing to find a compromise with Germany, but Berlin ignored his overtures. He then became very anti-German, to the point that Kaiser Wilhelm called him "The most dangerous man for Germany in France." Delcassé improved relations between France and Italy: at the same time, he adhered firmly to the alliance with Russia, and in August 1899 made a visit to Saint Petersburg, which he repeated in April 1901. In June 1900 he made an arrangement with Spain, fixing the long-disputed boundaries of the French and Spanish possessions in West Africa. Finally, in his greatest achievement, he concluded the Entente Cordiale with the UK, covering colonial and other questions which had long been a matter of dispute, especially concerning Egypt, Newfoundland and Morocco. Suspicion of the growing entente between France and the UK rose in Germany, and in 1905 German assertiveness was shown in a crisis which was forced on in the matter of French policy by Delcassé personally, a sore point with Germany. The situation became acute, and Germany forced Delcassé's resignation in June 1906. He retired into private life, but in 1908 was warmly welcomed on a visit to England.

=== Naval affairs ===
In 1909 Delcassé was appointed chairman of a commission appointed to investigate the French navy. The report was drawn up on 24 May 1909 and concluded that the French navy was unprepared and the naval administration and organization were in disarray. Delcassé was appointed Minister of Marine on 2 March 1911 in the cabinet of Ernest Monis. Delcassé promulgated closer cooperation between the British and French fleets. This arrangement was an important factor in leading Britain to side with France against Germany when World War I started.

On 25 September 1911, as the battleship Liberté was moored in Toulon harbor, an accidental explosion in one of her forward ammunition magazines for the secondary guns destroyed the ship. 210 men died and 136 were seriously injured. The captain, Louis Jaurès, was on leave at the time. After the explosion there was a debate in the Chamber of Deputies in which the honour of Jaurès and the responsibility for the use of unstable powder by the navy was questioned. Jaurès had to face a court martial, but was acquitted unanimously on 21 December 1911. Paul Painlevé, president of the navy committee, appointed a commission of inquiry after the explosion, which followed that of the battleship Iéna. Captain Antoine Schwerer was a member of the commission of inquiry and wrote a scathing "Report on Naval Powders" (1912). Delcassé ordered that all ammunition made before 1907 be replaced. The older ammunition was removed from the ships, and the remainder was steadily replaced with a new explosive containing diphenylamine as a stabilizer. Continued efforts were made to improve the powders, and there were no more major disasters. It was not until 1914 that the "powder crisis" was fully resolved.

Delcassé retained his position in the cabinet of Joseph Caillaux until its fall on 14 January 1912. Raymond Poincaré then urged Delcassé to become prime minister and minister of foreign affairs, but Delcassé declined; however, he would later agree to remain in Poincaré's cabinet as Minister of the Navy.

=== Later career ===
President Armand Fallières' term in office expired in January 1913, and Delcassé decided to leave the Ministry of Marine and run for the presidency. He did not succeed. After the election, which was won by Poincaré, a new cabinet was formed by Aristide Briand. Briand offered Delcassé the post of minister of marine or minister of war in the new cabinet, but Delcassé declined. He would soon be appointed ambassador to Russia, and then minister of war. On 26 August 1914 after the Germans announced successes in the north and east, René Viviani announced the resignation of the cabinet. In the new cabinet, announced within an hour, Viviani retained his post. Delcassé was minister of foreign affairs, Aristide Briand was minister of justice and Alexandre Millerand was Minister of War.

Delcassé resigned from the Cabinet on 14 October 1915, partly on the grounds of differing opinions and partly because of ill health.

== Honours ==
- Belgium: Grand Cordon of the Royal Order of Leopold, 1900
- Principality of Bulgaria: Grand Cross of the Order of St. Alexander, 1902
- Spain: Grand Cross of the Order of Charles III, with Collar, 9 July 1900
- United Kingdom: Honorary Grand Cross of the Royal Victorian Order, 4 May 1903

== Portrayal in media ==
- Portrayed by Harald Paulsen (Delcassé is credited as the "French Foreign Minister") in the 1941 German film Ohm Krüger
- Portrayed by Oliver Borlen in the 2012 Filipino film, El Presidente

== Sources ==
- Candar, Gilles; Duclert, Vincent (5 February 2014), Jean Jaurès (in French), Fayard, ISBN 978-2-213-68377-5
- This article incorporates text from a publication now in the public domain: Chisholm, Hugh, ed. (1911). "Delcassé, Théophile". Encyclopædia Britannica. Vol. 7 (11th ed.). Cambridge University Press. p. 953.
- "French Ministry Resigns", The Independent, 7 September 1914
- Gardiner, Robert, ed. (1979), Conway's All the World's Fighting Ships 1860–1905, Greenwich, UK: Conway Maritime Press, ISBN 978-0-8317-0302-8
- Porter, Charles Wesley (1936), The Career of Théophile Delcassé, University of Pennsylvania Press
- Schwerer, Antoine (1912), Rapport concernant les poudres de la marine, présenté à M. le ministre à la suite de l'enquête qui lui a été confiée, Paris: Impr. nationale, p. 268
- Vego, Milan (31 October 2013), Austro-Hungarian Naval Policy, 1904–1914, Taylor & Francis, ISBN 978-1-136-71337-8

Political offices
Preceded by Ernest Boulanger	Minister of Colonies; 1894–1895	Succeeded by Émile Chautemps
Preceded by Gabriel Hanotaux	Minister of Foreign Affairs; 1898–1905	Succeeded by Maurice Rouvier
Preceded by Auguste Boué de Lapeyrère	Minister of Marine; 1911–1913	Succeeded by Pierre Baudin
Preceded by Joseph Noulens	Minister of War; 1914	Succeeded by Adolphe Messimy
Preceded by Gaston Doumergue	Minister of Foreign Affairs; 1914–1915	Succeeded by René Viviani
