= Ernest Monis =

French politician (1846–1929)

Prime Minister of France
- In office 2 March 1911 – 27 June 1911
- President: Armand Fallières
- Preceded by: Aristide Briand
- Succeeded by: Joseph Caillaux

Personal details
- Born: 23 May 1846
- Died: 25 May 1929 (aged 83)
- Political party: Radical Party

Antoine Emmanuel Ernest Monis (French: [ɛʁnɛst mɔni]; 23 May 1846 in Châteauneuf-sur-Charente, in Charente – 25 May 1929 in Mondouzil, in Haute-Garonne) was a French politician of the Third Republic, deputy of Gironde from 1885 to 1889 and then senator of the same department from 1891 to 1920. He was Prime Minister of France for just under four months in 1911. He was also Minister of Justice in Pierre Waldeck-Rousseau's Bloc des gauches's cabinet (1899–1902) and Minister of the Navy in Gaston Doumergue's cabinet in 1913–1914.

Monis and his son were both injured in the opening event of the 1911 Paris to Madrid air race, which saw the Minister of War Henri Maurice Berteaux killed.

== Monis's Ministry, 2 March – 27 June 1911 ==
- Ernest Monis – President of the Council and Minister of the Interior and Worship
- Jean Cruppi – Minister of Foreign Affairs
- Maurice Berteaux – Minister of War
- Joseph Caillaux – Minister of Finance
- Joseph Paul-Boncour – Minister of Labour and Social Security Provisions
- Antoine Perrier – Minister of Justice
- Théophile Delcassé – Minister of Marine
- Théodore Steeg – Minister of Public Instruction and Fine Arts
- Jules Pams – Minister of Agriculture
- Adolphe Messimy – Minister of Colonies
- Charles Dumont – Minister of Public Works, Posts, and Telegraphs
- Alfred Massé – Minister of Commerce and Industry

Changes

- 21 May 1911 – François Louis Auguste Goiran succeeds Berteaux as Minister of War.

Political offices
Preceded by Georges Lebret	Minister of Justice; 1899–1902	Succeeded by Ernest Vallé
Preceded by Aristide Briand	Prime Minister of France; 1911	Succeeded by Joseph Caillaux
