= Arii Matamoe =

Painting by Paul Gauguin

Arii Matamoe (The Royal End)
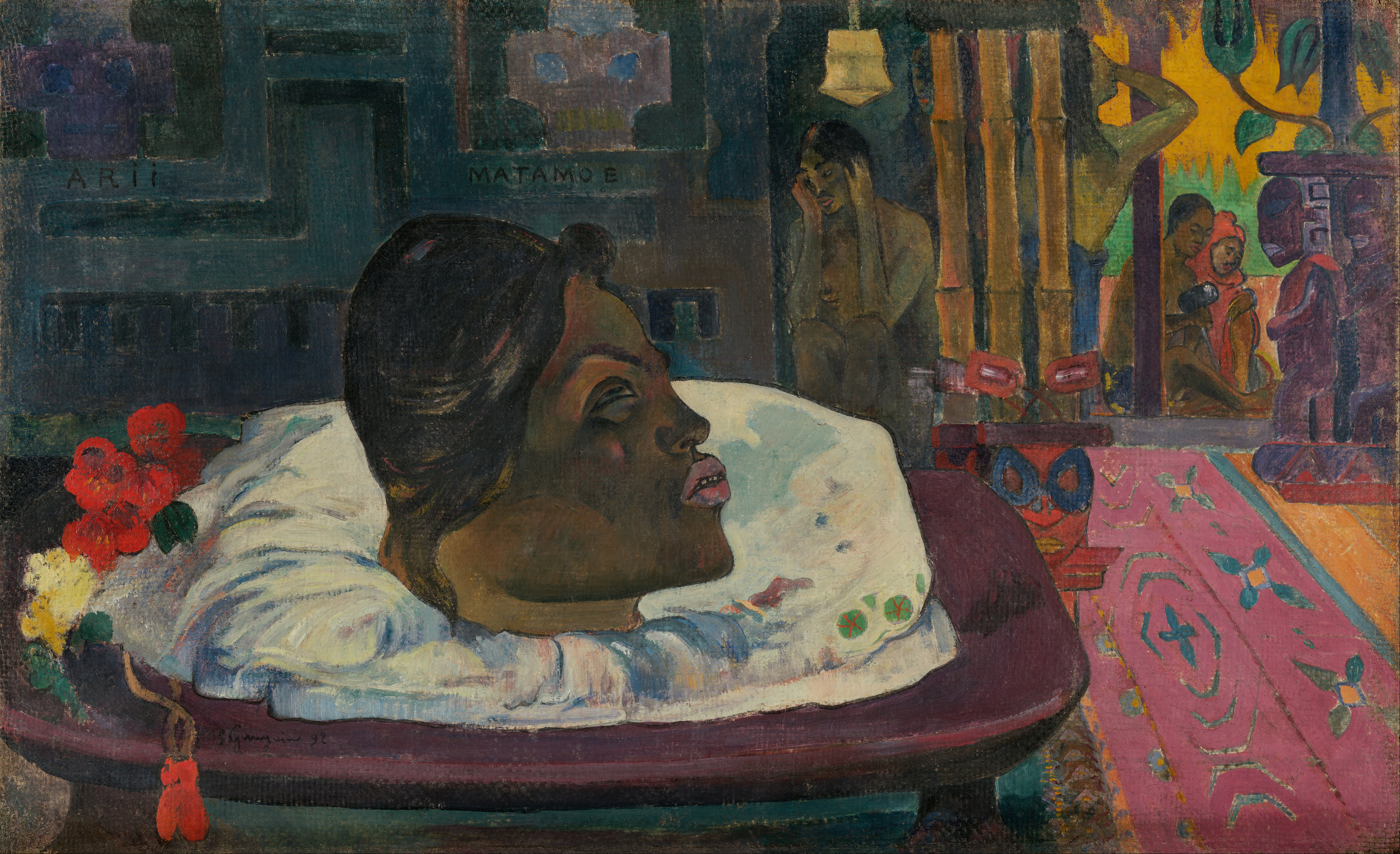
- Artist: Paul Gauguin
- Year: 1892
- Catalogue: 2008.5
- Type: Oil on coarse fabric
- Dimensions: 45.1 cm × 74.3 cm (17.8 in × 29.3 in)
- Location: J. Paul Getty Museum, Los Angeles, California

Arii Matamoe or The Royal End (French: La Fin royale) is a painting on coarse cloth by the French artist Paul Gauguin, created in 1892 during the painter's first visit to Tahiti. It depicts a man's severed head on a pillow, displayed before mourners, and although it did not depict a common or contemporary Tahitian mourning ritual, may have been inspired by the death of Pōmare V in 1891 shortly after Gauguin's arrival. A curator for the J. Paul Getty Museum suggested Gauguin likely painted the canvas "to shock Parisians" upon his expected return to the city.

== Origins and description ==
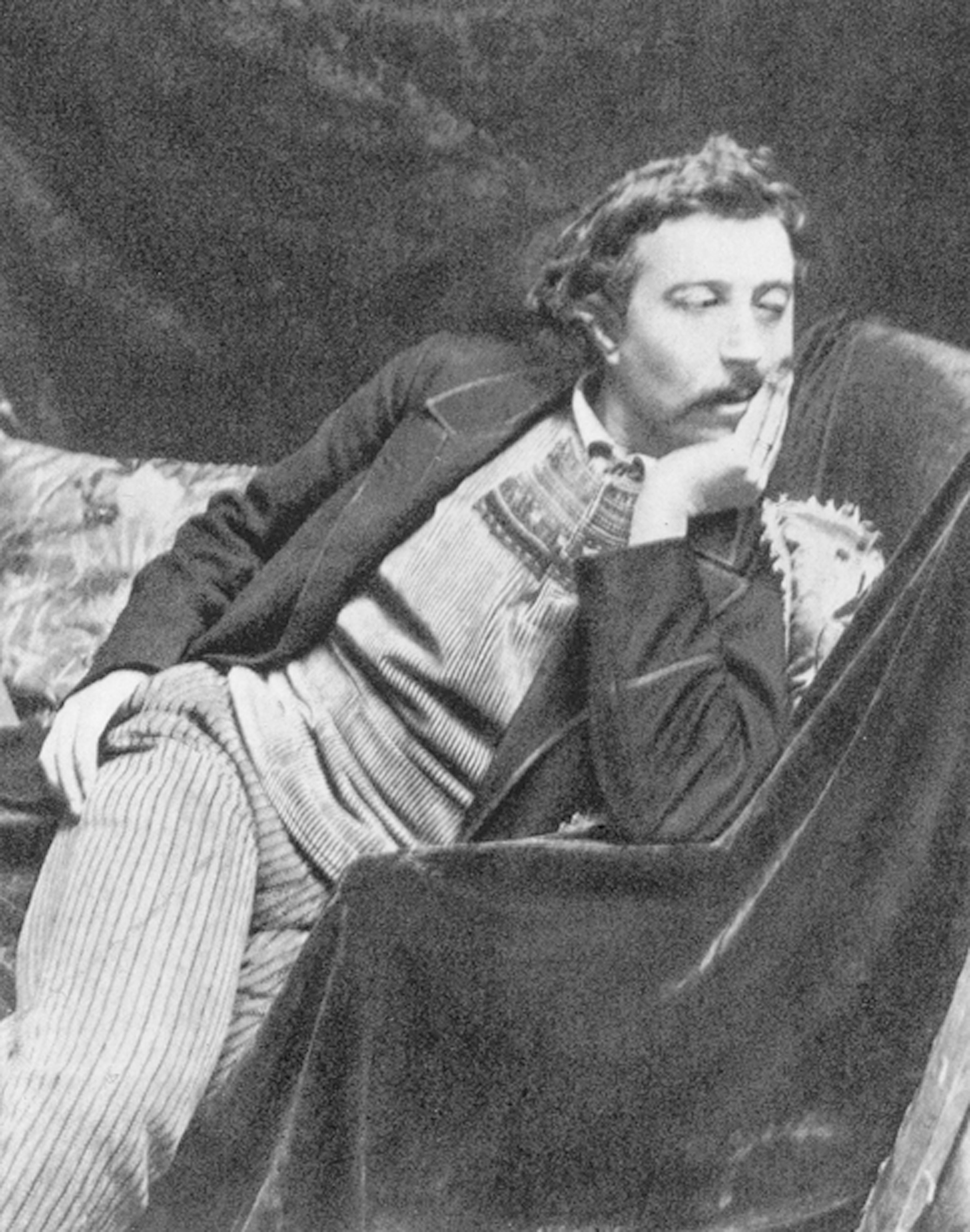
Paul Gauguin, c. 1891

In 1891, Gauguin sailed for Tahiti (a voyage lasting two months) expecting to experience an untouched Eden, far removed from his European experience. He was instead disappointed to discover that Pape'ete, the capital of the Tahitian colony, was heavily Europeanized and full of expensive distractions. Not finding life in Pape'ete conducive to his creative work, Gauguin moved after three months to the isolated village of Mataiea, near Papeari. It was here that his Tahitian-inspired vision flourished, and where he completed dozens of paintings.

"I have just finished a severed Kanak [Pacific Islander] head, nicely arranged on a white cushion, in a palace of my invention and guarded by women also of my invention", Gauguin wrote to his friend (and future biographer) Daniel de Monfreid in June 1892. The death of Pōmare V not long after Gauguin's arrival, as well as Gauguin's witnessing of a public execution by guillotine several years earlier, are both thought to have informed the work; Gauguin would later write in Noa Noa, a collage book which includes a photograph of Arii Matamoe (Noa Noa was compiled after Gauguin's stay in Tahiti and first published in 1901), that the death of the last Tahitian King seemed to him a metaphor for the disappearance of native Tahitian culture at the hands of Europeans. Pōmare V, who was pressured to abdicate and give Tahiti and its island dependencies to France in 1880, and who would later succumb to alcoholism, was not decapitated or put on similar public display. At best, such rituals were uncommon in Tahitian history.

In Arii Matamoe, Gauguin achieves a tropical sensibility through a color palette ranging from muted purples and browns to yellows, reds, and vivid pinks. The rustic, exotic qualities of Gauguin's imaginary "palace" are emphasized by the artist's choice of a rough, burlap-like cloth for his canvas. The severed head, displayed on a low-lying table or serving platter, is decorously presented with only a hint of blood; a despairing nude woman crouches nearby, while a figure just outside the room seems to proclaim the man's death to still more people further away. The interior is rich with Tiki-like figures and suggestive geometric patterns. Freely mixing Eastern and Western influences, Gauguin combined motifs and imagery borrowed from Tahitian, Javanese, French, and Peruvian sources, and by doing so created a rich symbolic mélange which, according to Gauguin scholar Elizabeth Childs, indicates that he was "interested in proving himself to a Parisian art market".

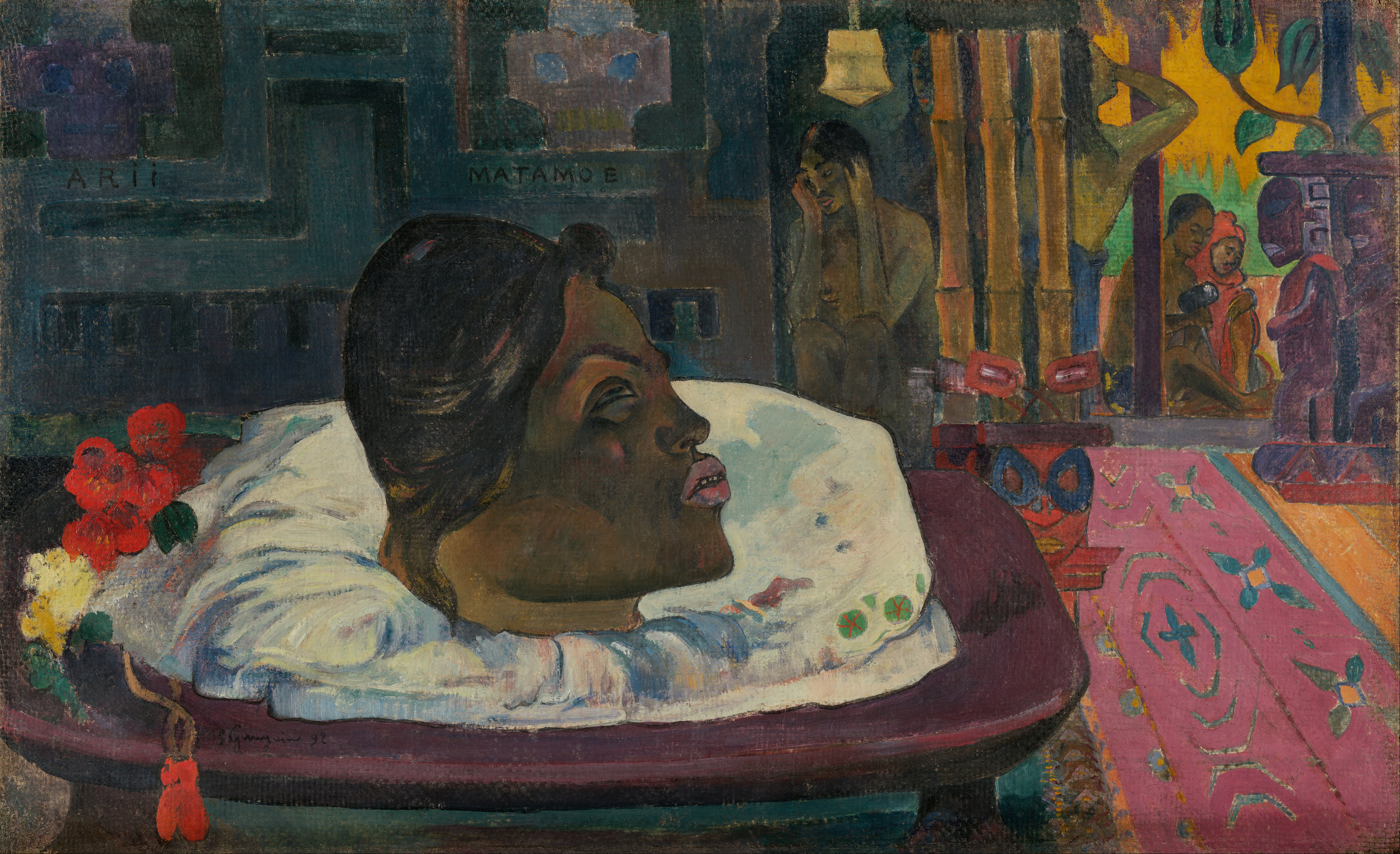
Arii Matamoe, enlarged detail

The words "ARii" (meaning "noble" or "royal", related to the Hawaiian word ali'i) and "MATAMOE" (meaning "sleeping eyes" and implying, in this context, death) are here written in the upper left background above the severed head, which itself alludes to imagery frequently seen in European painting such as of St. John the Baptist and Orpheus. The phrase "ARii MATAMOE", written in crisp capital letters, serves somewhat like the Latin phrase "ET IN ARCADIO EGO" in paintings by Poussin, for example, reminding both the figures within the scene and the outside observer of their mortality.

Getty curator Scott C. Allan has argued that Arii Matamoe is both a "symbolic self-portrait" and a "self-mythologizing work", which serves both to fetishize Gauguin's fantasies of cultural estrangement and martyrdom while hinting of possible redemption and renewal.

== Provenance and exhibition history ==
The painting was exhibited in Paris by the dealer Paul Durand-Ruel in November 1893, along with 40 other recently created Gauguin works, but did not immediately sell; it also failed to find a buyer in the Bernheim-Jeune auction of Gauguin works in 1895. The artist Henry Lerolle would purchase Arii Matamoe at auction in 1895 for 400 francs from Drouot, and eventually bequeath it to his wife in 1929. It was briefly owned by the collaborationist writer and art collector Émile Roche, who sold it "before the war" to Georges Leven, a prominent French-Jewish lawyer and acting director of the Alliance Israélite Universelle until his death in 1941; Leven's heirs consigned the painting to an unknown Geneva gallery between 1941 and 1945.

Although well known to art historians and scholars, the painting was privately owned after World War II by a Swiss collector who, after 1946, lent it only once for an obscure domestic exhibition. After eight years of negotiations, the J. Paul Getty Museum in Los Angeles announced its purchase in March 2008, declining to name the painting's last private owner or the painting's cost (estimated around $30 million by Le Figaro). At the time, Getty curator of paintings Scott Schaefer called Arii Matamoe "the ultimate still life" and "the most famous painting by Gauguin that no one has seen". After a light cleaning, the painting has been on public display since and has been lent by the Getty for several exhibitions.
