= Pantalon rouge =

Red trousers worn by the French army

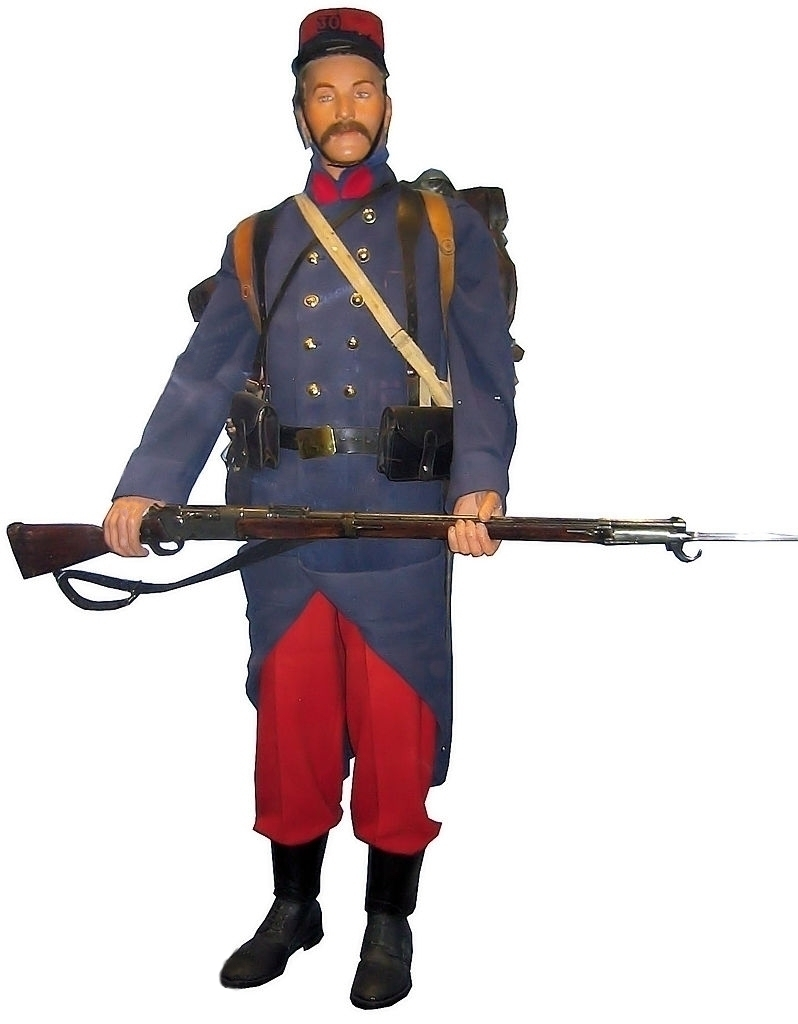
French infantry uniform of 1914

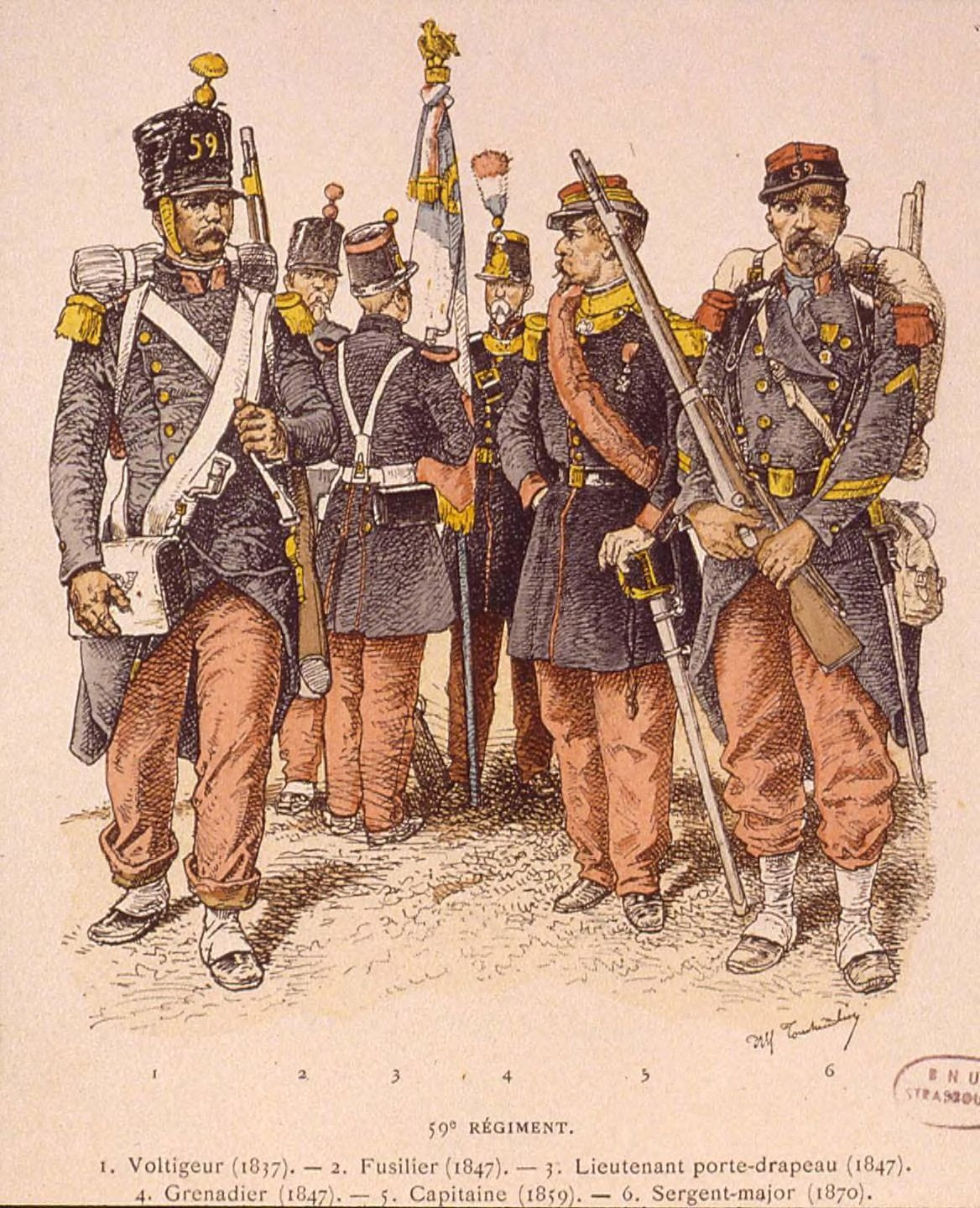
A progression of French infantry uniforms from 1837 (left) to 1870 (right)

The pantalon rouge (French for 'red trousers') were an integral part of the uniforms of most regiments of the French army from 1829 to 1914. Some parts of the Kingdom of France's army already wore red trousers or breeches but the French Revolution saw the introduction of loose fitting white trousers for infantrymen. Following the 1814 Bourbon Restoration white breeches or blue trousers were worn but red trousers for infantry were adopted in 1829 to encourage the French rose madder dye-growing industry. Madder red is a shade darker than the scarlet of British uniforms.

By the early 20th century other European nations had adopted drab combat uniforms as a response to the changing nature of warfare. An early 1914 attempt by the Minister of War Adolphe Messimy to modernise the French infantry uniform was rejected after opposition in the press that it was "contrary both to French taste and military function". The bright French uniform contributed to the high casualty rate in the first months of the First World War. In December 1914 the French adopted a less conspicuous horizon blue uniform based on Messimy's proposal. The change in uniform was due to a shortage of the German-produced artificial alizarin dye which had been used in place of the traditional madder dyes.

== Use ==
During the early years of the 18th century red breeches were worn by 23 of the dragoon regiments of France's royal army, but after 1757 a yellowish shade of brown was substituted. Later Kingdom of France uniforms varied significantly between regiments but red breeches were limited to generals, members of the royal household, and the Maréchaussée (until 1763). Infantry regiments universally wore white breeches after the 1750s, replacing the mixture of regimental colours previously favoured by individual colonel-proprietors. With the often chaotic transition period of the revolution, breeches were frequently replaced with trousers in the army and during the French Revolutionary Wars infantrymen wore both types of garment in white cloth, often with multiple stripes in variegated colours. Standardised issues of white breeches returned during the Napoleonic period but red was worn by cavalrymen of the Imperial Guards of Honour, the lancers, three regiments of hussars and the 3rd Regiment of Scouts of the Imperial Guard.

The Bourbon Restoration of 1814 brought in departmental legions in white coats and white breeches. When line infantry regiments were restored in 1820 they were issued blue trousers. Red breeches or trousers featured more heavily in the cavalry, being worn by the guard hussars, dragoons, lancers, chasseurs à cheval and most regiments of hussars.

The pantalons rouge were adopted by the French Army on 26 July 1829, to encourage the rose madder dye-growing industry in France. This distinctive garment was quickly adopted by most regiments and became symbolic of the French Army for the remainder of the century.

By the 20th century the synthetic dye alizarin, imported from Germany, was used to colour the cloth of the pantalons rouge. The French infantry wore the same pattern of trouser from 1867 to 1914. During the Franco-Prussian War of 1870-71 the trousers became so synonymous with the French soldier that civilians referred to them as "red legs" or "red trousers".

On the eve of mobilisation for the First World War (August 1914) red trousers or breeches formed a conspicuous part of the uniforms worn by all branches and corps except the Chasseurs a' pied, artillery, engineers, colonial troops and certain North African native regiments (tirailleurs and spahis). The most spectacular version of the pantalons rouge was the voluminous "oriental dress" worn by the zouaves. In red cloth this was so conspicuous that with the outbreak of war it had to be replaced by a white summer version until re-tailored blue and eventually khaki trousers could be issued.

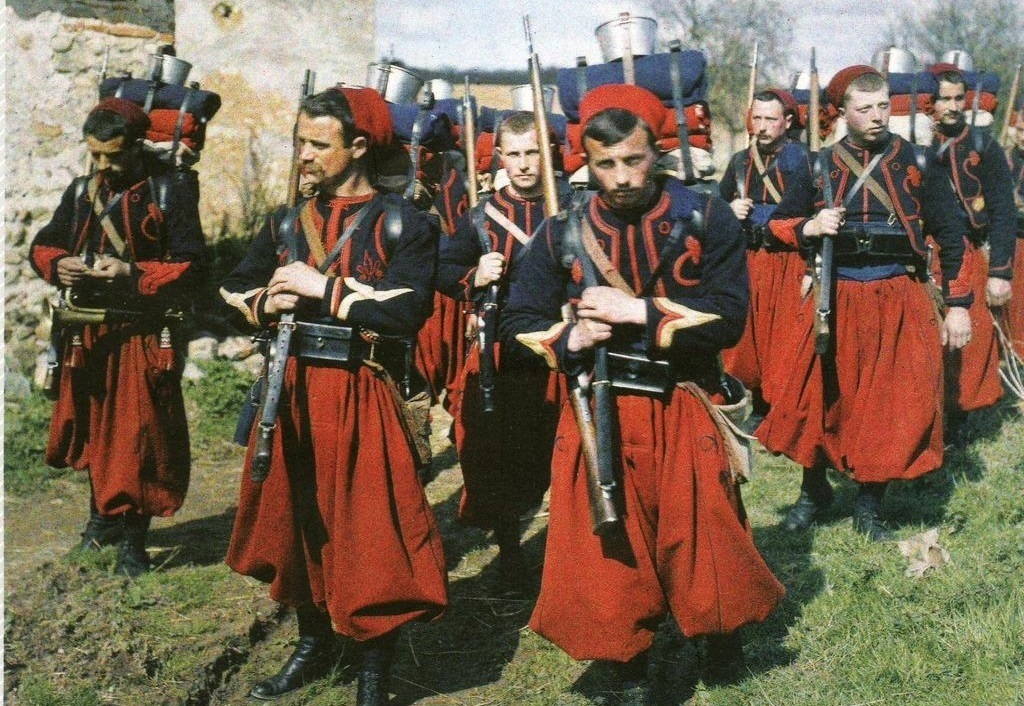
Early colour photograph of French 3rd Zouaves 1912

In addition to the bulk of the infantry and cavalry units, red trousers were also worn by non-combatant personnel belonging to the medical, veterinary and administration sections of the army.

== Replacement ==
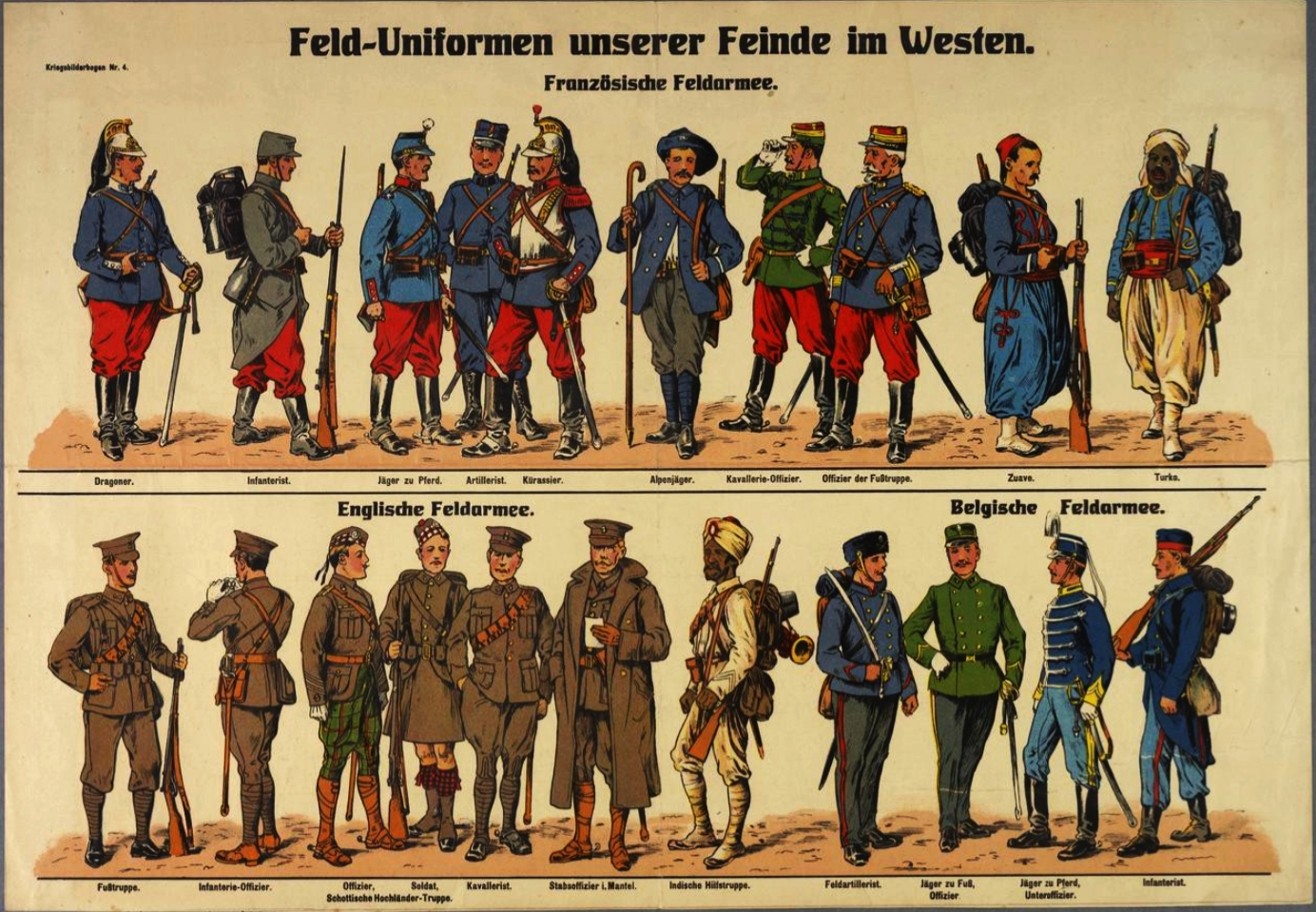
A comparison of French (upper), British (lower left) and Belgian (lower right) army uniforms in 1914

With changes in battlefield technology and tactics comparable European armies had switched from colourful uniforms to more drab versions in the period leading up to the First World War. The British Army adopted a Khaki field service uniform, in place of the traditional infantryman's red coat, just after the Second Boer War (1899–1902), Imperial Russia moved from "Tsar's green" to khaki-grey between 1908 and 1910, and in 1909 the German army replaced its traditional Prussian blue uniform with feldgrau, a grayish green color. The United States, Austro-Hungary, Italy and the Ottoman Empire all made similar moves between 1902 and 1910. However for reasons of national pride and military morale these major powers, and many smaller armies, largely retained their historic brightly coloured uniforms for ceremonial, parade, and off-duty "walking out" dress until the outbreak of war in 1914.

Suggestions that the French army adopt predominantly brown or grey uniforms were rejected in the decades preceding the war. After observing the actions of the 1912–13 Balkan Wars the French minister of war Adolphe Messimy, well-regarded as a humane and professional army officer, proposed replacing the pantalon rouge, red kepis and blue tunics with less conspicuous colours. Messimy's proposal was for a uniform of so-called tricolore fabric, woven from a mix of 60% blue wool, 30% red wool and 10% white wool.

The proposal was fiercely opposed in the press which objected to the army wearing "muddy, inglorious" colours; the Écho de Paris stated that "to banish all that is colourful, all that gives the soldier his vivid aspect, is to go contrary both to French taste and military function". Former war minister Eugène Étienne also opposed the proposal, declaring "jamais! le pantalon rouge, c'est la France" ("never! the red trousers are France"), which became a catchphrase of the conservative movement in France. The outcry over the proposal almost cost Messimy his ministerial position.

The infantryman's uniform, including the pantalon rouge, was especially visible in the yellow-cropped fields that were fought over in August and September 1914, contributing to the high French casualty rate. After the outbreak of war, red alizarin dye could no longer be obtained from Germany. As a result, in December 1914 the French Army adopted a variation on Messimy's 1913 proposal. The mix of blue and white wool was retained, but without the red component, producing a uniform in horizon blue. Whilst less conspicuous than the pre-war uniform it was not perfect: the colour showed up well on the blue-sensitive film used in aerial photography of the time. The Germans had carefully developed their feldgrau to be hard to detect by photography or the naked eye. The Armée d’Afrique initially adopted uniforms made from khaki cloth manufactured in Britain, but later changed to a lighter brown colour with a yellowish tinge known as "mustard" (moutarde).

== Limited readoption ==
During the First World War red trousers never completely vanished from depots plus lines of communication units and training establishments, although this reflected shortages of the new horizon-blue garments rather than nolstalgia. From 1928 the colourful pre-war uniforms were reintroduced for those regiments of the French Army of Africa (Algeria, Tunisia, Morocco) that were primarily dependent on voluntary enlistment. Limited to parade and off duty wear, this recruitment measure meant that red trousers were worn again until 1939 by officers and re-enlisted personnel of the tirailleurs, zouaves and chasseurs d'Afrique. Only the Foreign Legion did not return to pantalons rouge after peacetime stocks were used up after 1919. In 1931 serving officers of all metropolitan and colonial branches were required to acquire full dress for social and ceremonial occasions in pre-1914 colours. In addition to these officers, cadets at the Saint Cyr Military Academy reappeared in blue and red from 1931 onwards.

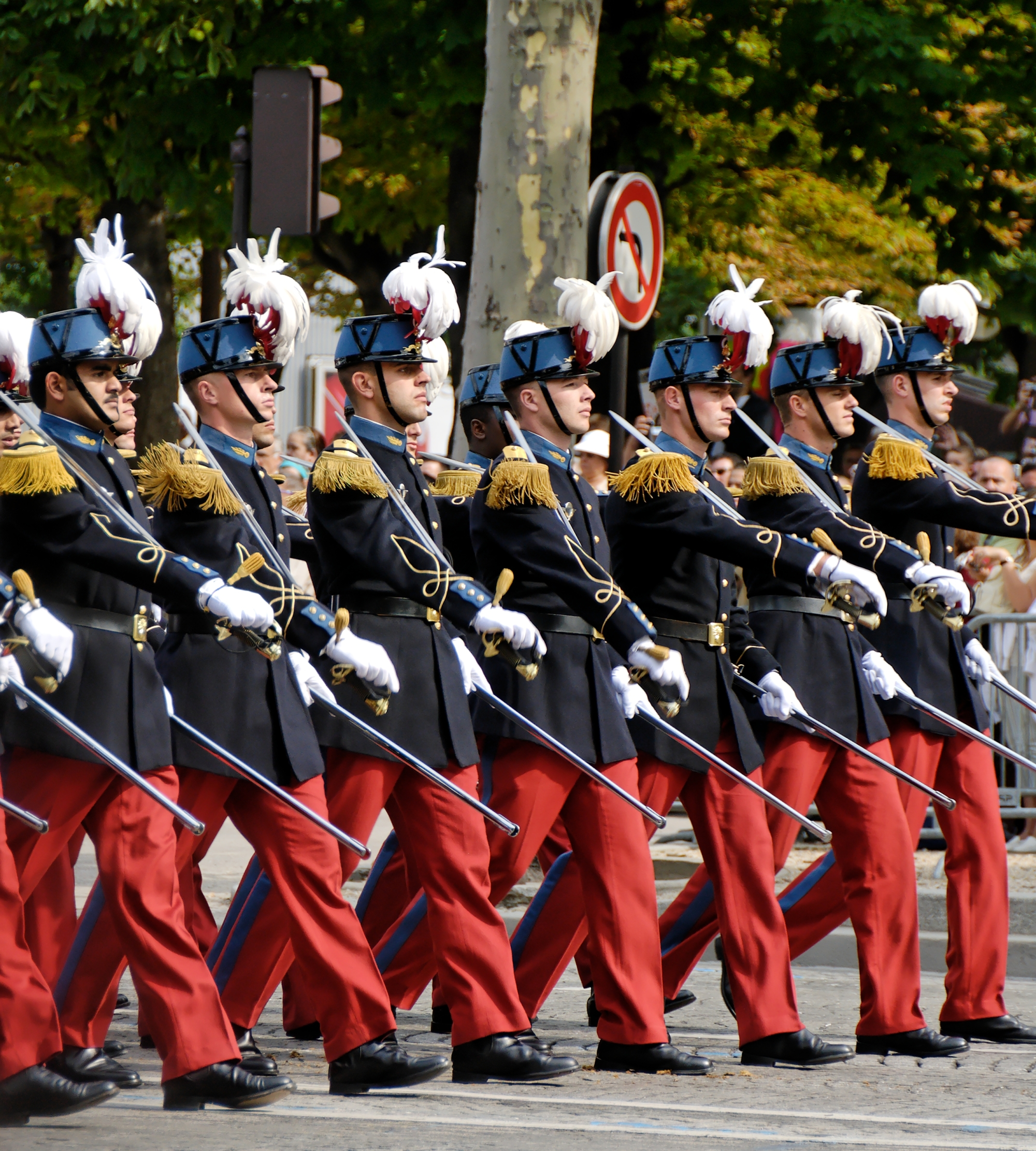
Sr Cyr cadets 2007

The Second World War marked the final termination of the pantalons rouge, with the notable exception of Saint Cyr; plus a limited number of military bands and small detachments from units that had historically worn this iconic garment in various forms between 1829 and 1914.

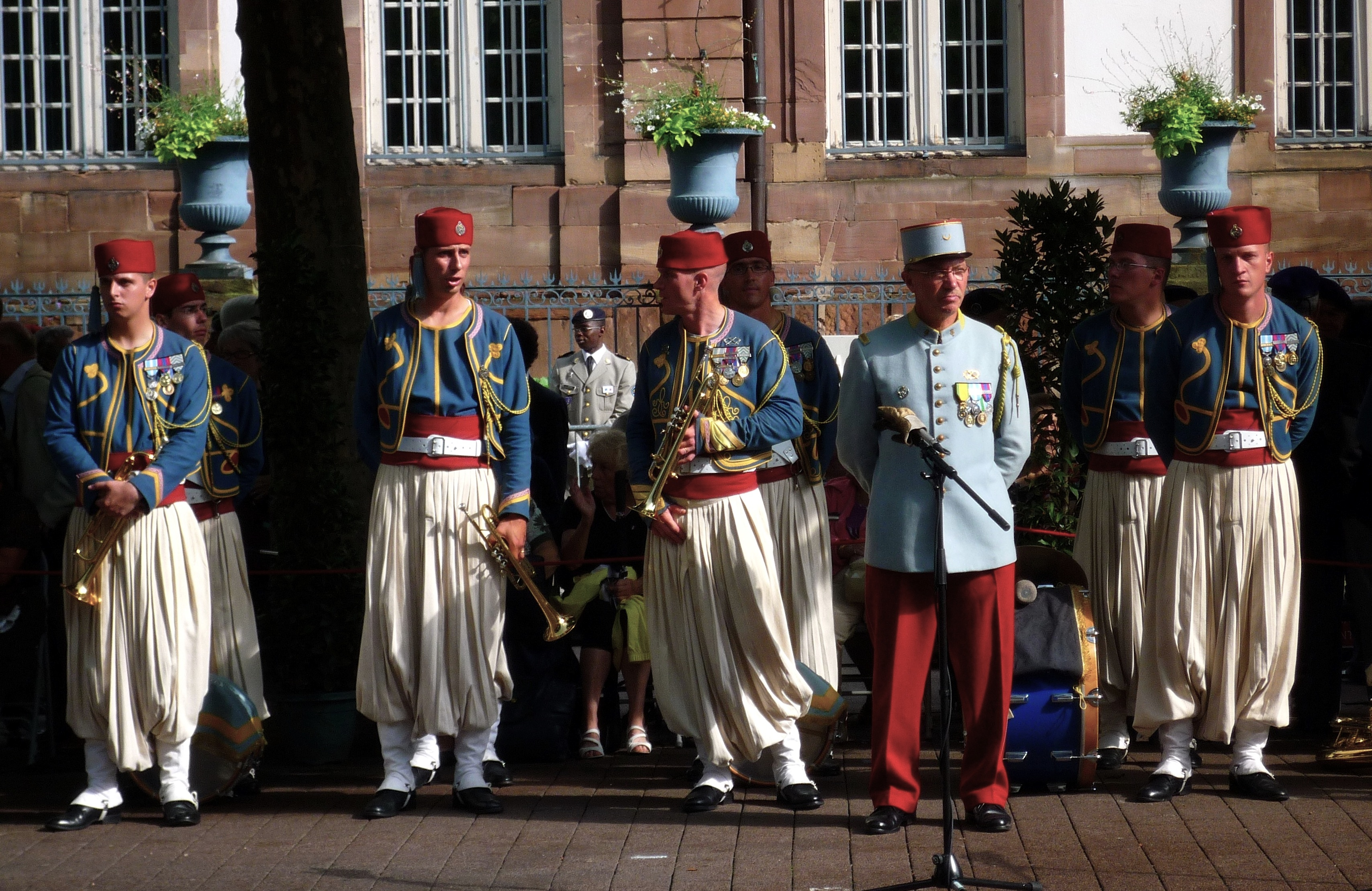
Bandsmen of the modern 1st Tirailleur Regiment of Épinal. Officer in pantalons rouge

== Gallery ==
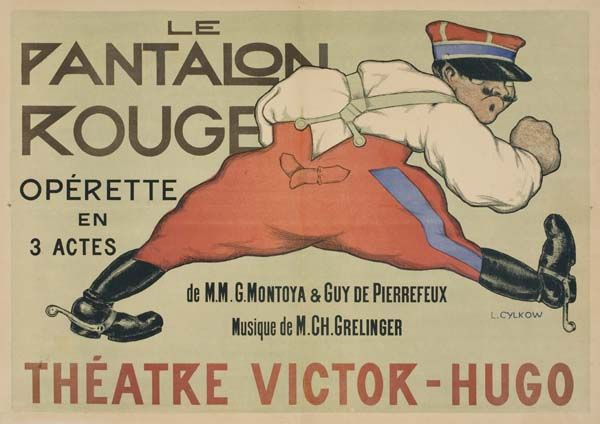
A poster for a 1904 operetta entitled Le Pantalon Rouge and depicting a French army officer

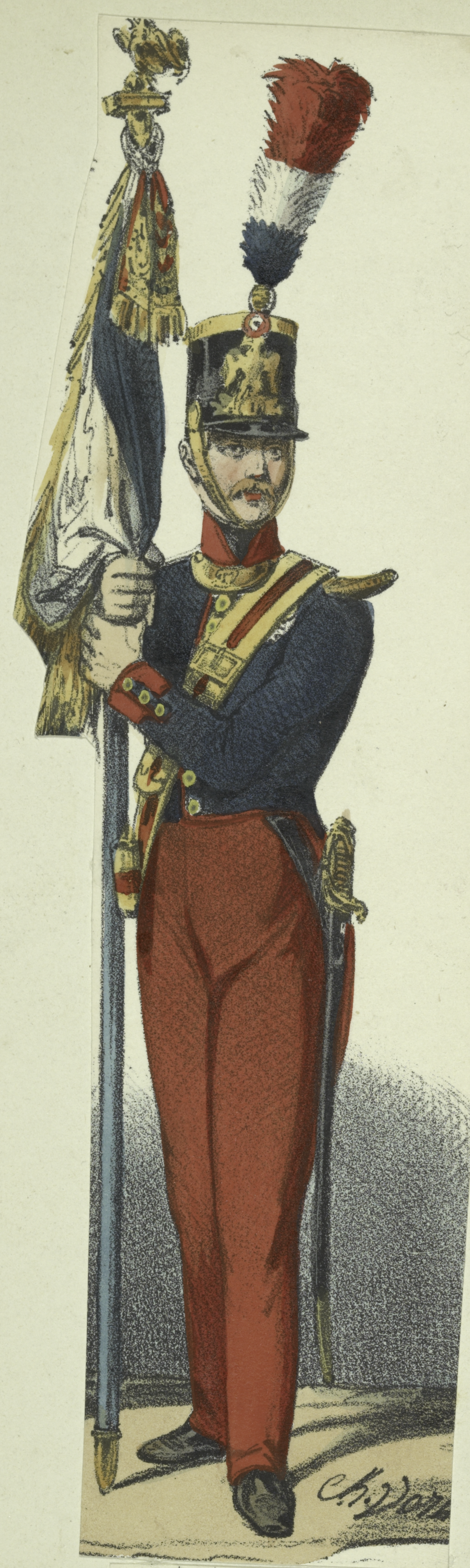
French light infantry uniform, 1830
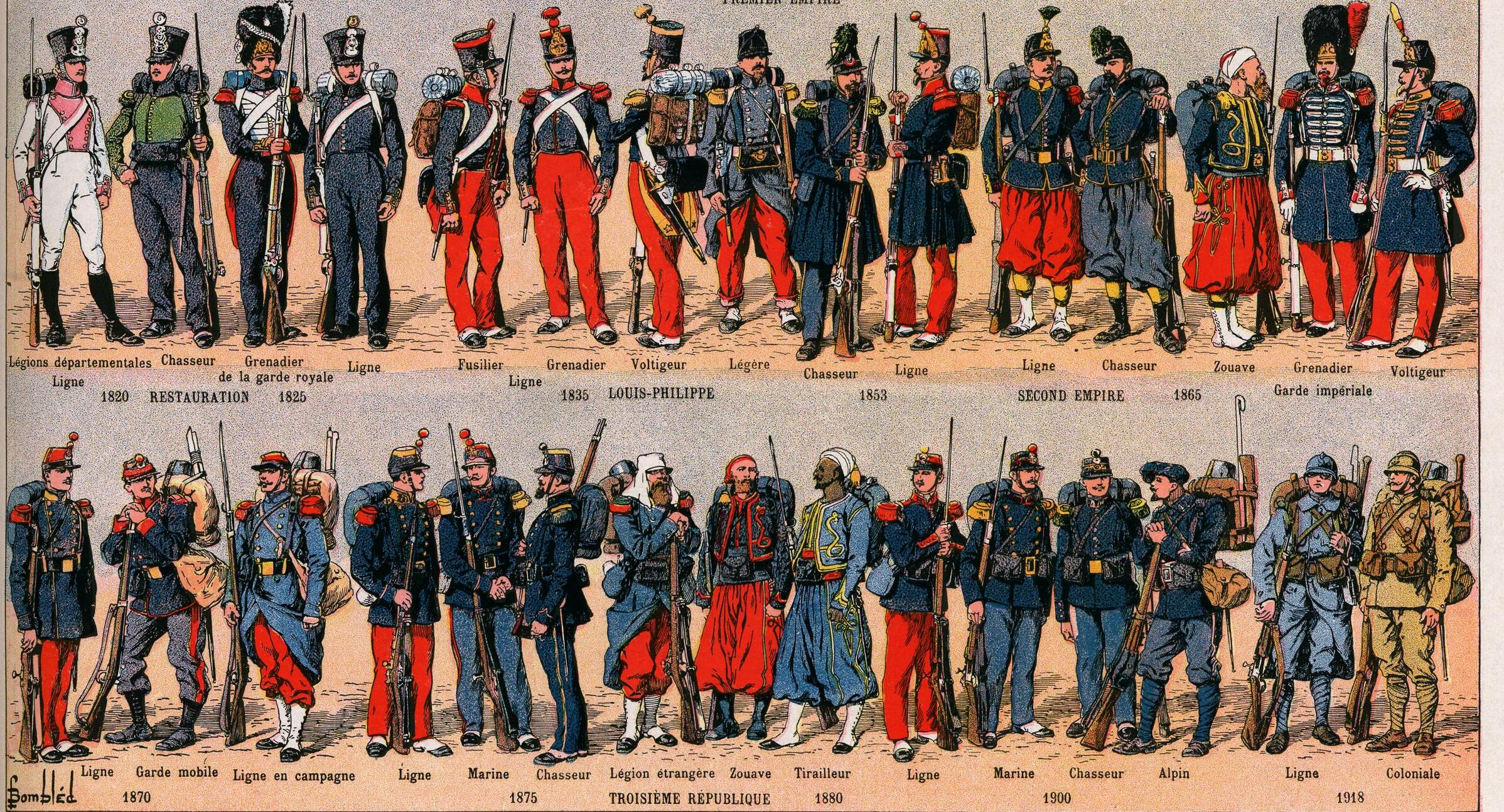
French army uniforms from 1820 (upper left) to 1918 (lower right)
