= Horizon blue =

Colour

Color coordinates
- Hex triplet: #7CA2B8
- sRGB^{B} (r, g, b): (124, 162, 184)
- HSV (h, s, v): (202°, 33%, 72%)
- CIELCh_{uv} (L, C, h): (65, 30, 229°)
- Source: Horizon blue
- B: Normalized to [0–255] (byte)

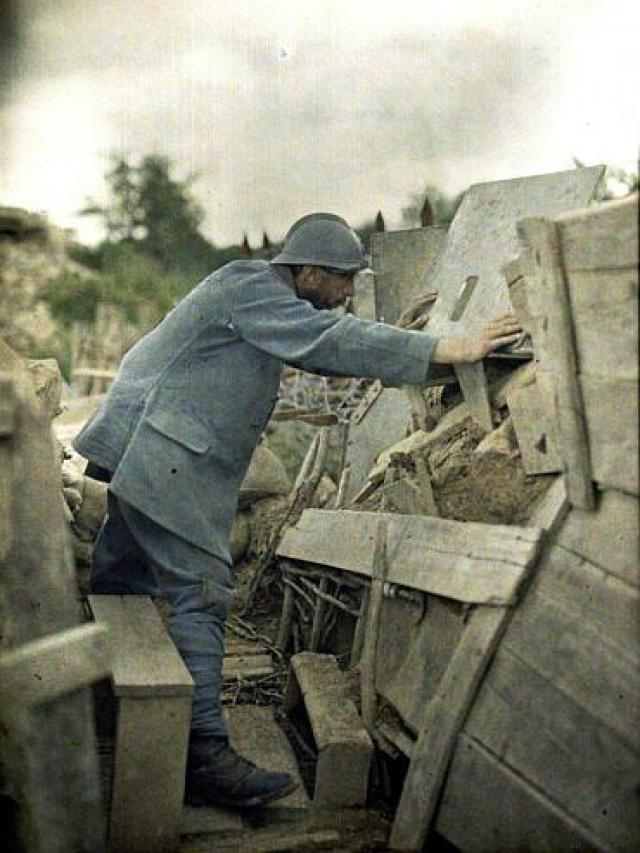
A French soldier wearing a horizon blue uniform during World War I

Horizon blue is a colour name known for being used for the blue-grey uniforms of French metropolitan troops from 1915 through 1921.

This name for a shade of blue of the indefinable colour which separates the sky from the earth, had been previously used in the world of fashion, and has been since then. It had also served as an emblem of political groups prevailing upon the army of the Great War.

== Historical account ==
=== First uses ===
The expression "horizon blue", certified to have been used in feminine fashion in 1884, was used afterward for hundreds of colour denominations in fashion, without making itself noticed.

The expression "horizon colour" is found in diverse descriptions in and after 1895. In 1899, the Journal des débats pointed out that the motor boats destined for the administrators of the Cayenne convict prison were "painted in horizon colour, to conceal them more easily".

The Répertoire de Couleurs published in 1905 by the Society of chrysanthemists, showed four tones of Horizon Blue, "colour which recalls the blue of the sky at the horizon", synonym of "Imitation Cobalt Blue".

=== The horizon blue uniform ===
The colour of the uniform of the French infantry became known as "horizon blue" in three steps:

1. The first orders at the end of 1914 designated a new uniform cloth as "light blue".
2. On 16 January 1915, an article of L'Illustration designated the colour of the uniform of the soldiers as "horizon colour". On the 26th, Le Matin likened this colour to horizon blue. In February, the newspaper Le Temps compared the old and new uniforms: "The dark cloth of the old overcoats is seen side by side with the light azure of the new "horizon colour" uniform. In the Spring of 1915, the expression was popularized. Becoming insensibly horizon blue, it was in general usage in September. It would never become an official term.
3. The expression became so popular that it was found in official descriptions of the army. The employment of "horizon blue cloth" instead of "light blue" can be explained notably by the fact that this expression possessed a national character and seemed "to echo the famous blue line of the Vosges." However, regulations continued to name the uniform cloth as "light blue cloth" until 1921 and even beyond.

==== Prewar trials ====
In 1914, the French army was equipped with overcoats of a medium blue colour called "blued steel grey", and madder red trousers and kepis. This was a historic combination dating back to 1828. At the beginning of the twentieth century, the Boer War attracted the attention of the general staffs of the great powers on the need to reform military clothing. A study made in 1892 determined that it was more difficult to shoot at a grey-blue target than at a red and blue one. Between 1903 and 1914, the French army tried a number of new uniforms of subdued colours: in 1902 the grey-blue uniform called "Boërs", in 1906 the beige-blue one, in 1911 the reseda uniform.

All these attempts at reforms failed as a result of the opposition of public opinion. French command finally chose blue-grey in November 1912 by decision in principle of Alexandre Millerand. On 26 May 1914 the High Council of War voted for the adoption of a cloth called "tricolour" obtained by a mixing of blue, white and red wool fibres. The law of 18 July 1914 prescribed the replacement of uniforms with ones where all items of which would be completely manufactured from a new cloth of this colour.

Why the colour blue? It had already been adopted on the principle, according to a decision made by the Minister after the meeting of 26 May 1914 of the High Council of War. Blue had been judged to be the only colour which could be usefully chosen, considering that all other shades, and among them the neutral tints, had been put into service in foreign armies.

—Chief of Logistics Defait (1921)

==== August 1914 ====
On 2 August 1914, the day of general mobilization, the Ministry of War adopted a unique blue cloth for the manufacture of sets of uniforms. On 8 August, the Logistics Chief Defait, director of logistics of the Ministry of War, renounced the adoption of tricolour cloth upon the advice of Mr. Balsan, cloth manufacturer at Châteauroux. Two factors prevented the adoption of tricolour cloth: the lack of alizarin, the synthetic madder dye manufactured in Germany, among others, by BASF, and the difficulty of putting into production tricolour cloth by the entirety of French cloth manufacturers for whom uniform production was difficult to organize in the middle of war. On 14 August 1914, the ministry demanded by telephone for the Balsan company to provide samples of new cloths in different tones of blue included between the regulation shades "blued steel grey" and "sky blue". Maurice Allain, director of production at the mill proposed in particular a cloth returning to the process of dyeing fibres of wool of the cloth "blued steel grey" intended for prewar overcoats. In this manner the cloth manufacturers would not waste the wool fibres already dyed for that purpose and the know-how of the dyers would be maintained. On the morning of 16 August 1914, the administrative director of drapery at Châteauroux, Roger de La Selle brought to Paris samples for the war ministry. During the day, Logistics Chief Defait submitted the cloth samples to Adolphe Messimy in his office, who personally selected the blued steel grey cloth brightened by light blue fibres and white fibres. The following day, 17 August 1914, this cloth was officially adopted for sets of uniforms for the French army.

==== Horizon blue cloth in 1914–1918 ====
The first deliveries of uniforms of this colour reached the troops at the end of September 1914. It took about a year before the whole French army is equipped with it. This period is called the clothing crisis.

The cloth was composed of white wool (35%) and of wool tinted blue-indigo (15% dark blue wool, 50% light blue wool). This horizon blue was not totally appreciated by the poilu, as the colour did not stand up well to light and inclement weather:

Our well-brushed overcoats have their flaps lowered, and as they are usually raised, two squares where the cloth is more blue can be seen standing out on these flowing flaps.

—Barbusse, Le Feu.

=== After the Great War ===
Horizon blue rapidly became the symbol of the poilu of World War I. After the conflict, it symbolized the ex-military men and intransigent nationalism of the horizon blue Chamber composed, in 1919, of conservatives eager to "make Germany pay."

French metropolitan troops adopted khaki cloth, called "American khaki", by vote of the High Council of War on 6 November 1921. The council having in the meantime decided to expend the enormous existing stocks of horizon blue cloth, clothing remained variegated during the interwar period. Certain rear-echelon troops were still equipped with uniforms of horizon blue cloth during the Battle of France.

In the twenty-first century, the expression "horizon blue" is found, in fashion and literature, with its descriptive character, from before the Great War, to designate outfits of blue-grey cloth, or eye colour.

After the founding of the Coëtquidan Officer Candidate School on 1 February 2021, horizon blue full dress uniforms were chosen for its students to honor the service of reserve officers who served in World War I.

== See also ==
- Feldgrau
- Khaki
- Military camouflage
- Rose madder
- World War I
