= Jean Dupuy (politician) =

French politician and media owner (1844–1919)

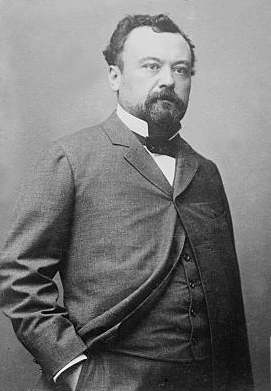
Jean Dupuy in 1914.

Jean Dupuy (1 October 1844, Saint-Palais, Gironde – 31 December 1919, Paris) was a French politician and media owner.

== Life ==
A huissier by profession, he practiced in Paris and quickly became interested in the press and in politics, taking over leadership of Le Petit Parisien on the death of Paul Piégut in 1888. He renewed that journal's formula and its circulation continued to rise, reaching 1 million at the time of the Dreyfus affair.

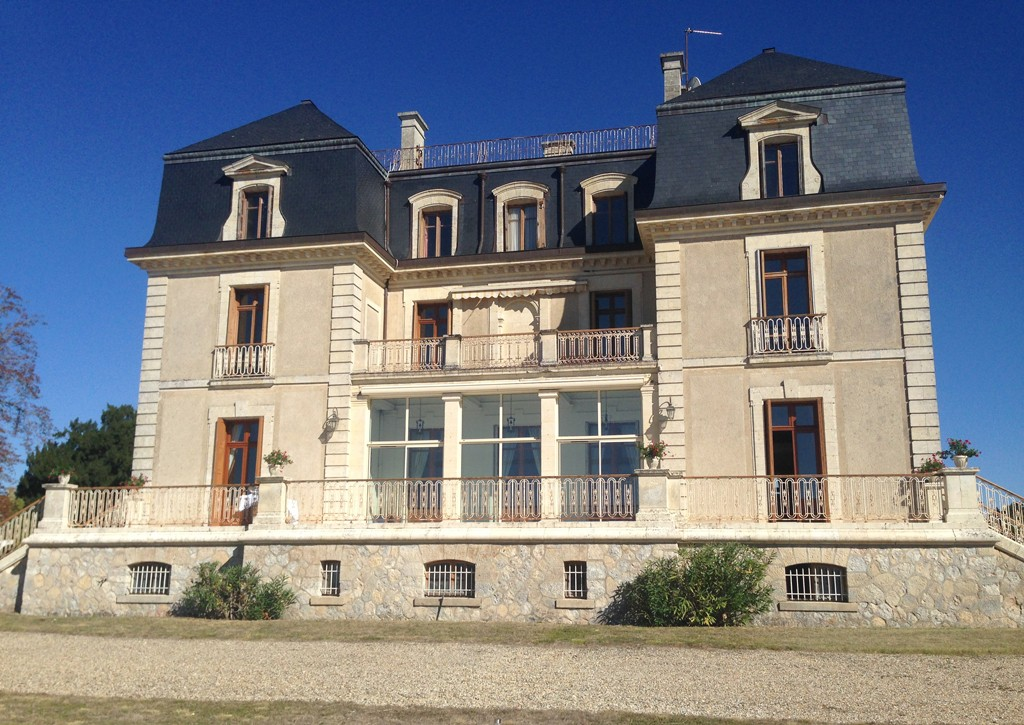
Château Segonzac, his Bordeaux wine estate

In 1887, he bought Château Segonzac, a Bordeaux wine estate ravaged by phylloxera and almost abandoned, from the Viscount of Saint-Aulaire, then mayor of Blaye. He undertook major modernization work, commissioning the Blaye architect Aurélien Nadaud to design a new experimental mechanical vat room, powered by a steam engine, and a wine cellar with a capacity of 1,700 barrels. In 1892, the facilities were awarded a prize by the Gironde Agricultural Society.

In 1891, Jean Dupuy was elected senator for Les Hautes-Pyrénées and joined the Republican Left. He thus defended the free exchange regime (which wanted to abolish the agriculture minister Jules Méline) in his journal. Named minister of agriculture himself in the government of Pierre Waldeck-Rousseau, from 22 June 1899 to 3 June 1902, he organized the Crédit Agricole and created the Office of agricultural information. He also defended the French wheat producers in the assembly during the 1900 debate into the import and export of wheat and flour.

He then occupied other posts in different governments, notably that of minister for commerce and industry (1909–1911), then Minister of Public Works, Posts and Telegraphs (1912–1913 and June 1914), and minister of state (1917). Commander of the Mérite agricole, he was a member of the Académie d'Agriculture and the higher committee for agriculture.

Reelected a député on 3 January 1909, he died in 1919 after having launched the magazine La Science et la Vie in 1913. Le Petit Parisien then exceeded a circulation of 2 million copies, the highest in the world at the time. Jean's sons Pierre and Paul Dupuy took over from him, and also created other press groups.

He received the Order of Osmanieh from the Sultan of the Ottoman Empire in early 1900.
