= Joseph Caillaux =

French politician

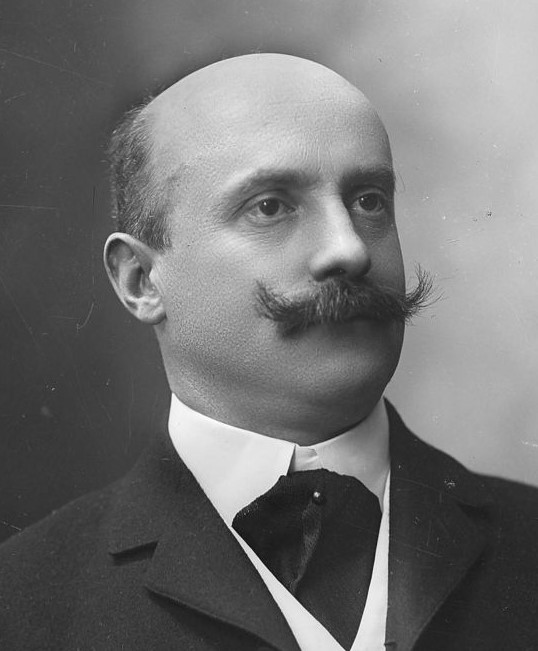
- Caillaux in the 1890s

Prime Minister of France
- In office 27 June 1911 – 11 January 1912
- President: Armand Fallières
- Preceded by: Ernest Monis
- Succeeded by: Raymond Poincaré

Personal details
- Born: Joseph-Marie-Auguste Caillaux; 30 March 1863 Le Mans, France
- Died: 22 November 1944 (aged 81) Mamers, France
- Party: Radical Party

Joseph-Marie-Auguste Caillaux (French: [ʒozɛf maʁi oɡyst kajo]; 30 March 1863 – 22 November 1944) was a French politician of the Third Republic. He was a leader of the French Radical Party and Minister of Finance, but his progressive views in opposition to the military alienated him from conservative elements. He was accused of corruption, but was cleared by a parliamentary commission. This political weakness strengthened the right wing elements in the Radical Party.

== Early life ==
The son of Eugène Caillaux, he studied law and attended lectures at the École des Sciences Politiques. He entered the civil service in 1888 as an inspector of finance, and spent most of his official career in Algiers. Standing as a Republican candidate in the elections of 1898 for the department of the Sarthe, in opposition to the Duc de la Rochefoucault-Bisaccia, he was elected to the Chamber of Deputies by 12,929 votes to 11,737. He became Minister of Finance in the Waldeck-Rousseau Cabinet, and after its fall it was not until the Clemenceau Ministry of 1906 that he returned to office, once more with the portfolio of Finance. During the revolt of the Languedoc winegrowers on 22 May 1907 Caillaux tabled a bill on wine fraud. The text submitted to Parliament provided for an annual declaration of their harvest by wine growers, prohibition of second-cycle sweetening, and control and taxation of purchases of sugar.

In 1911 he became prime minister. The leader of the Radicals, he favored a policy of conciliation with Germany during his premiership from 1911 to 1912, which led to the maintenance of the peace during the Second Moroccan Crisis of 1911. He and his ministers were forced to resign on 11 January 1912, after it was revealed that he had secretly negotiated with Germany without the knowledge of President Armand Fallières.

Nevertheless, thanks to his undoubted qualities as a financier, he remained a great power in French politics. He fought the Three Years' Service bill with the utmost tenacity. Although that measure became law, it was he who finally, on the financial aspect of that bill, brought about the downfall of the Barthou Ministry in the autumn of 1913.

While the Entente Cordiale was in effect, it was impossible for Caillaux to return to the position of prime minister, but he joined the succeeding Doumergue Cabinet as Minister of Finance. As a financial expert, he had long identified himself with a great and necessary reform in the fiscal policy of France—the introduction of the principle of an income tax. Throughout the winter of 1913, he campaigned for this principle. His advocacy of an income tax, and his uncertain and erratic championship of proletarian ideas, alarmed all the conservative elements in the country, and throughout the winter he was attacked with increasing vehemence from the platform and through the press. Those attacks reached their highest point of bitterness in a series of disclosures in the newspaper Le Figaro of a more or less personal nature.

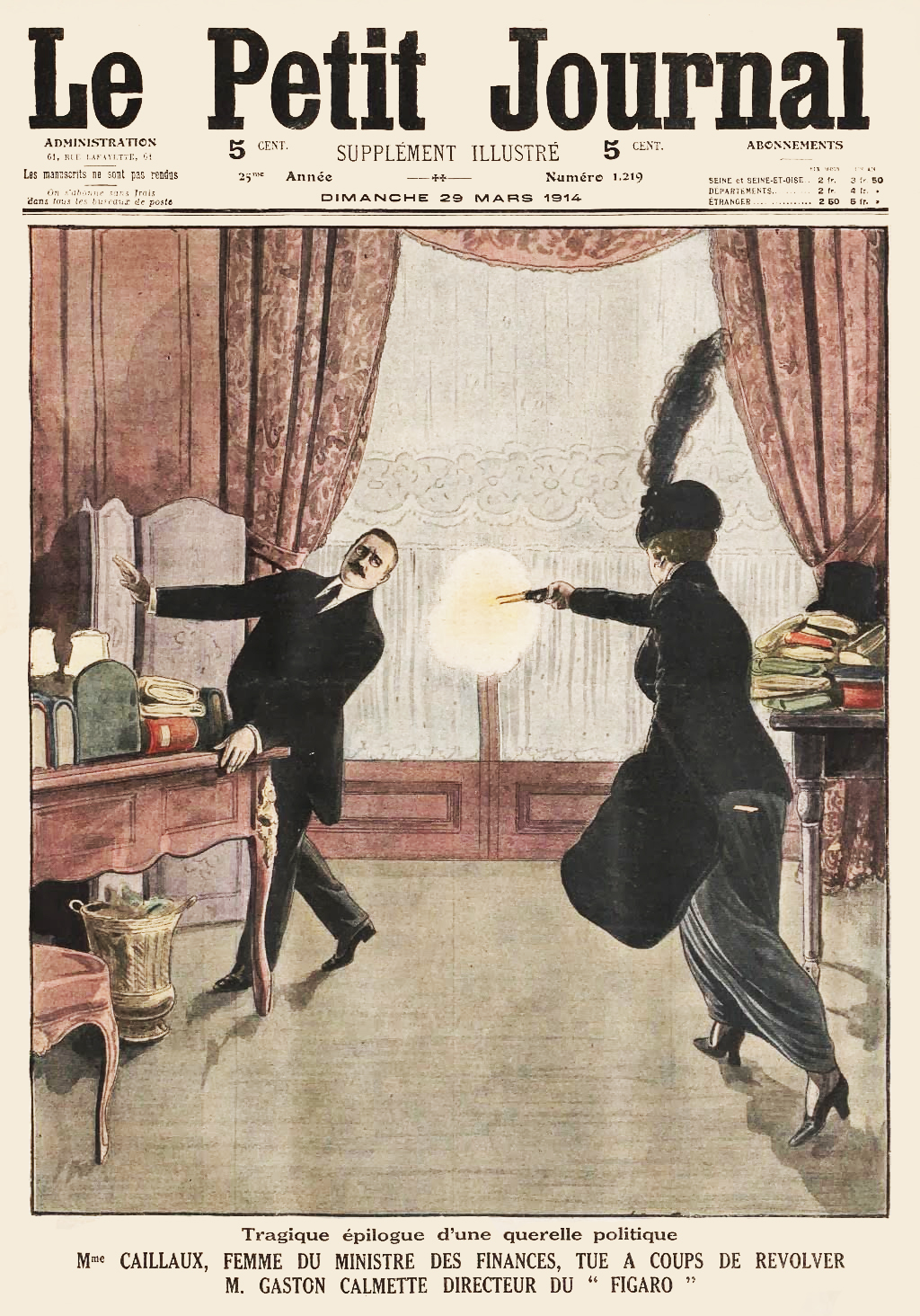
Cover of "Le Petit Journal" illustrating the assassination of Gaston Calmette, the editor of "Le Figaro"

In 1914, Le Figaro started the publication of love letters that had been sent by Caillaux to his second wife Henriette while he was still married to the first, Berthe Gueydan. In March 1914, Madame Caillaux in turn shot to death Gaston Calmette, the editor of Le Figaro, and Caillaux resigned as Minister of Finance. In July 1914, Madame Caillaux was acquitted on the grounds that she committed a crime passionel.

Caillaux became the leader of a peace party in the Assembly during World War I. After a mission to South America, he returned in 1915, and at once began to lobby. He financed newspapers, and did everything he possibly could behind the scenes to consolidate his position. He became acquainted with the Bolos and the Malvys of political and journalistic life. By the spring of 1917, he had become in the eyes of the public "l'homme de la défaite", the man who was willing to effect a compromise peace with Germany at the expense of Great Britain. However, the advent of Clemenceau to power killed all his hopes. This led to his arrest for treason in 1917. After a long delay, he was convicted of high treason by the High Court of the Senate, and sentenced to three years' imprisonment, the term he had already served. He was also forbidden to reside in French territory for five years and deprived of civil rights for ten years.

Again rehabilitated after World War I, Caillaux served at various times in the left wing governments of the 1920s.

On 10 July 1940, Caillaux voted as a Senator in favour of granting the cabinet presided by Marshal Philippe Pétain authority to draw up a new constitution, thereby effectively ending the French Third Republic and establishing Vichy France.

Joseph Caillaux is interred in the Père Lachaise Cemetery in Paris.

His political collaborators included the Nord region journalist and politician Émile Roche.

== Caillaux's Ministry, 27 June 1911 – 11 January 1912 ==
- Joseph Caillaux – President of the Council and Minister of the Interior and Worship
- Justin de Selves – Minister of Foreign Affairs
- Adolphe Messimy – Minister of War
- Louis-Lucien Klotz – Minister of Finance
- René Renoult – Minister of Labour and Social Security Provisions
- Jean Cruppi – Minister of Justice
- Théophile Delcassé – Minister of Marine
- Théodore Steeg – Minister of Public Instruction and Fine Arts
- Jules Pams – Minister of Agriculture
- Albert Lebrun – Minister of Colonies
- Victor Augagneur – Minister of Public Works, Posts, and Telegraphs
- Maurice Couyba – Minister of Commerce and Industry

== See also ==
- List of people on the cover of Time Magazine: 1920s

== Works ==
- The Fiscal Question in France, King, 1900.
- Whither France? Whither Europe?, T. Fisher Unwin, 1923.

=== Articles ===
- "Economics and Politics in Europe," Foreign Affairs, Vol. 1, No. 2, 15 December 1922.
- "France's Needs and Europe's Danger," The Living Age, 10 February 1923.
- "Destiny Has Changed Horses," The Living Age, 4 October 1924.
- "A United States of Europe," The Living Age, 6 June 1925.
- "A Gospel of Firmness and Vigor," The Living Age, 31 July 1926.
- "Whither is Civilisation Drifting?," The Windsor Magazine, Vol. LXX, June/November 1929.

Political offices
Preceded by Ernest Monis	Prime Minister of France; 1911–1912	Succeeded by Raymond Poincaré
