= Adolphe Messimy =

French politician and general

The Most Excellent General Adolphe Messimy
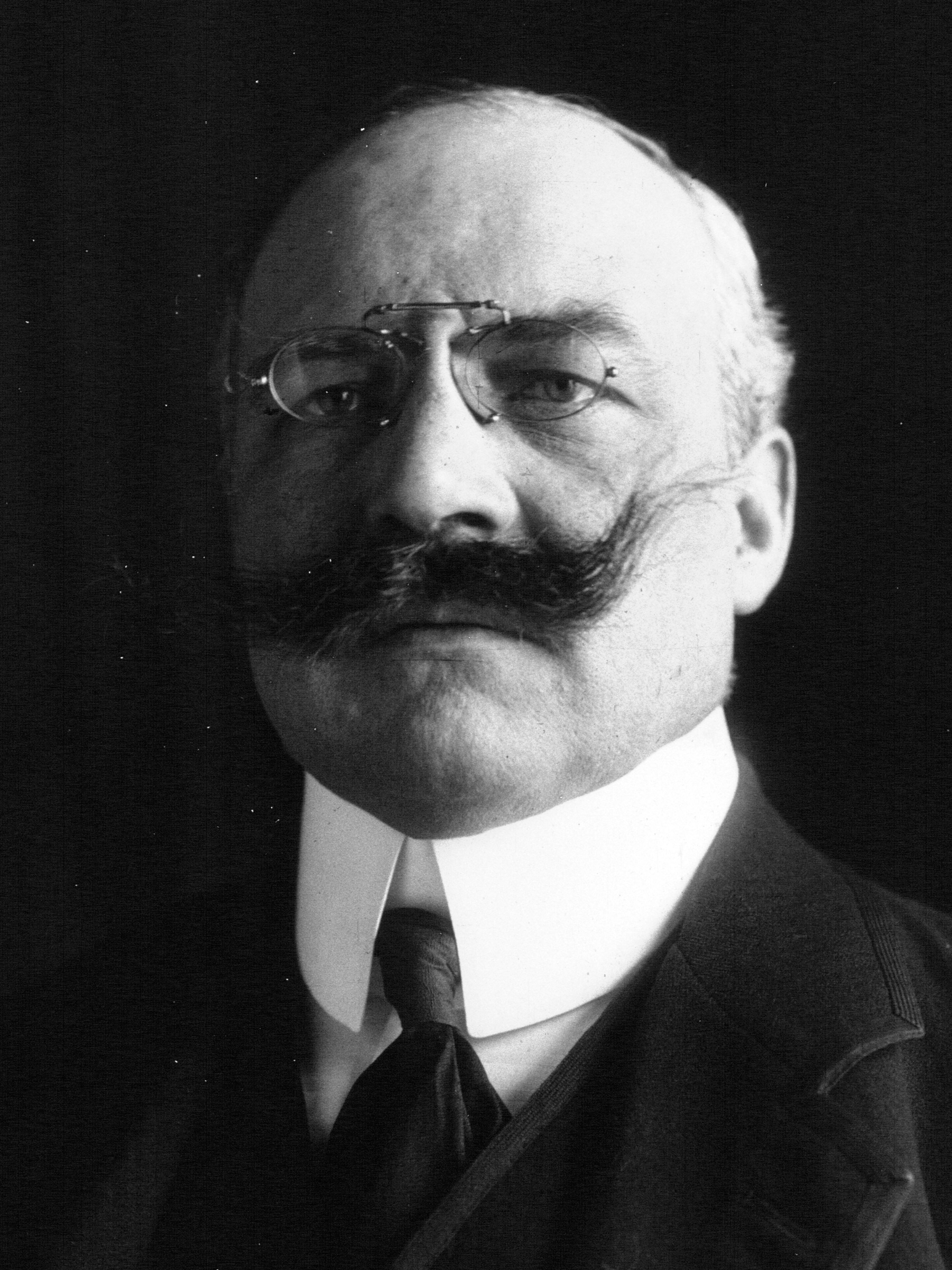

Minister of the Colonies of France
- In office 2 March – 27 June 1911
- President: Armand Fallières
- Prime Minister: Ernest Monis
- Preceded by: Jean Morel
- Succeeded by: Albert Lebrun

Minister of War of France
- In office 27 June 1911 – 14 January 1912
- President: Armand Fallières
- Prime Minister: Joseph Caillaux
- Preceded by: François Goiran
- Succeeded by: Alexandre Millerand
- In office 13 June 1914 – 23 August 1914
- President: Raymond Poincaré
- Prime Minister: Rene Viviani
- Preceded by: Théophile Delcassé
- Succeeded by: Alexandre Millerand

Commander of the 162nd Infantry Division
- In office 9 September 1917 – 15 January 1919
- President: Raymond Poincaré
- Minister of War: Paul Painlevé; Georges Clemenceau
- Chief of Staff: Ferdinand Foch; Henri Alby
- Preceded by: General Rauscher
- Succeeded by: Military unit dissolved

Personal details
- Born: Adolphe Marie Messimy; 31 January 1869 Lyon, Rhône, France
- Died: 1 September 1935 (aged 66) Charnoz-sur-Ain, Ain, France
- Spouse(s): Andreé Cornil; Marie-Louise Blanc
- Parent(s): Paul Charles Léon Messimy (father); Laurette Marie Anne Girodon (mother)

Military service
- Allegiance: France
- Branch/service: (France) French Army
- Years of service: 1887–1889; 1914–1919
- Rank: General
- Unit: (France) 162nd Infantry Division
- Battles/wars: WWI: Campaign of Alsace; Battle of Somme; Liberation of Colmar

Adolphe Marie Messimy (French: [adɔlf maʁi mɛsimi]; 31 January 1869 – 1 September 1935) was a French politician and general. He served as Minister of War in 1911–12 and then again for a few months during the outbreak of and first three weeks of the First World War. Having begun his career as an army officer, he returned to the Army and successfully commanded a brigade at the Battle of the Somme, and later a division. Defeated for re-election to the Chamber of Deputies in 1919, he served as an influential senator from 1923 until his death in 1935.

== Early and personal life ==
Born in Lyon on 31 January 1869, Adolphe Messimy was the eldest son of notary Paul Charles Léon Messimy and Laurette Marie Anne Girodon. He married Andrée, the daughter of Victor Cornil, whom he divorced in 1921. His second marriage, in 1923, was to Marie-Louise Blanc (née Viallar), a widow. He had two children from each marriage.

Tuchman described him as “an exuberant, energetic, almost violent man, with … bright peasant’s eyes behind spectacles and a loud voice”.

His hobbies were mountain-climbing and collecting weapons and furniture.

== Early career ==
Messimy entered the military academy of Saint-Cyr at the age of eighteen and after graduation began a career as a line officer. He was promoted to captain at the age of twenty-five and at twenty-seven attained his Brevet d'état-major (qualified as a staff officer), opening up the promise of an excellent military career. In 1899 he resigned from his post as a captain of chasseurs in protest at the Army's refusal to reopen the Dreyfus case, entering politics determined on “reconciling the army with the nation".

After leaving the Army he became a journalist, writing on military matters for a number of Paris newspapers including Le Temps, le Matin, le Rappel, le Radical and Lyon-Républicain. He also published documented studies in La Revue politique et parlementaire, La Revue des questions coloniales, La Revue bleue and Revue de Paris.

He also became an administrator of the General Company of Niger.

== Prewar political career ==
He was elected to the Chamber of Deputies as a Radical-socialiste in 1902, for the Seine constituency (14th arrondissement of Paris). In the second round (11 May) he defeated the incumbent deputy, Girou, by 9,068 votes to 8,569. In 1905 he voted in favour of the law separating church and state.

He was re-elected as a Gauche radicale-socialiste, again at the second round, on 20 May 1906, by 11,894 votes to 5,438 for his opponent Fraguier. On 8 May 1910, once again at the second round, he was re-elected as a Républicain radicale-socialiste by 9,462 votes to 7,182 for his opponent Grangier.

His prewar writings included: "The Armed Peace, France can Lighten the Burdens" (1905), "General Considerations on the Organisation of the Army" (1907), "The Army and its Cadres" (1909) and "Our Colonial Work" (1910).

== Peacetime war minister ==
Messimy became Minister of the Colonies in the government of Ernest Monis and served from 2 March 1911 to 27 June 1911.

From 27 June 1911 to 14 January 1912 Messimy served as Minister of War in the government of Joseph Caillaux. He was the fourth new War Minister that year, and within a few days of his appointment the German gunboat Panther arrived at Agadir, sparking the Second Moroccan Crisis.

Until 1911 the vice-president of the Conseil Supérieur de Guerre (a body of senior generals, chaired by the President of the Republic) was commander-in-chief designate in the event of war but had no planning staff, whilst the Army Chief of Staff reported to the War Minister and dealt solely with administrative matters. The vice-president, General Victor-Constant Michel, proposed that the French Army adopt a more defensive war plan and attach a regiment of reserves to each regular regiment. Messimy, in common with senior French generals, thought that these plans would blunt the fighting spirit of the French Army. He described them as “comme une insanité” and Michel a “national danger” and helped to ensure his removal.

Messimy abolished the job of vice-president, and created a new post – soon given to General Joseph Joffre – of Chief of the General Staff (and Commander-in-Chief designate). There were to be two sub-chiefs, one heading the General Staff, based in the ministry and a member of the War Minister's military cabinet, whilst the other was chief of staff to the Commander-in-Chief and dealt with mobilisation and concentration. Alexandre Millerand abolished the former post (in his 1912–13 tenure), helping to create the situation where Joffre acquired enormous power in his hands during the early years of the First World War. Messimy was suspicious of Joffre's choice of the clericalist right-winger General de Castelnau as his chief of staff.

As War Minister Messimy proposed other reforms. He advocated that the manpower of the French Army should be enhanced with large contingents of black Africans, a view which he shared with General Charles Mangin. Like President Theodore Roosevelt he ordered generals to conduct manoeuvres on horseback, to weed out elderly and unfit generals who were “incapable not only of leading their troops but of following them". Messimy and General Auguste Dubail had tried to introduce 105mm heavy guns, but French generals saw them as a defensive weapon like machine guns and as a drag on their offensive doctrine, preferring the more mobile "Soixante-Quinze" gun, so only a few had been introduced by 1914.

== Out of office ==
Returning to his native district, Messimy was, on 25 February 1912, elected deputy for the arrondissement of Trévoux (the Ain) for the Parti républicain radical et radical socialiste, replacing Donat-Auguste Bollet, who had become a senator. Messimy polled 9,734 votes against 4,648 for Ducurtyl and 3,420 for Nanssex, out of 18,186 ballots cast.

After visiting the Balkans and seeing the advantage held by Bulgarians in their inconspicuous uniforms, Messimy also proposed replacing the red kepi and pantalon rouge (red trousers) worn by the French Army since 1830 by a grey-blue or grey-green uniform (the British Army had recently switched from scarlet to khaki and the Germans from blue to field-grey). This plan was blocked by French generals and politicians. Messimy later wrote of the “blind and imbecile attachment to the most visible of all colours”.

He was re-elected for his Ain seat unopposed on 26 April 1914, obtaining all of the 11,713 votes cast and holding the seat until his defeat in 1919.

== War Minister in 1914 ==
=== July Crisis ===
On 13 June 1914 he entered the government, led by René Viviani, as Minister of War. On 24 July 1914 Messimy summoned Joffre to warn him that war was likely.

News of the German Kriegesgefahr (announcement of danger of war) was announced around 5.30pm on 31 July. Messimy, who had been tipped off an hour earlier by a banking friend in Amsterdam, told the cabinet it was “une forme hypocrite de la mobilisation”. Joffre, who had previously been ordered to keep French troops 10 km away from the frontier, arrived and demanded French mobilisation, but was only allowed to send a “covering order” because of the Tsar’s last minute appeal to the Kaiser. Messimy was left fretting at the “green baize routine” by which each minister was permitted to speak in turn at cabinet meetings.

The next morning (1 August), after the German ultimatum to Russia, the cabinet agreed that the mobilisation order could be issued but Messimy was required to keep it in his pocket till 3.30pm. Public posters appeared at 4pm, but that evening Messimy had to order the Army, in the president's name, to keep out of the 10 km zone, on pain of court martial. Not even patrols were permitted, and special orders were issued to General Foch, commander of XX Corps, who was suspected of patrolling aggressively. Until the Germans were confirmed to have entered Belgium, Messimy forbade any French troops to enter in case reports were a trick to make the French into the violators of Belgian neutrality.

Messimy was keen to bring the Colonial Corps from North Africa to France. In the fraught atmosphere of the Crisis he was challenged to a duel on 2 August by Navy Minister Armand Gauthier, who had forgotten to send torpedo boats into the English Channel but now wanted to redeem his reputation by using the French Navy to attack the German warships Goeben and Breslau, currently in the Mediterranean, before Germany and France were actually at war. He eventually embraced Messimy tearfully and was persuaded to resign on grounds of health.

=== French defeat and defence of Paris ===
The Germans attacked the outermost Liège forts on 5 August. Three cavalry divisions under General Sordet were to enter Belgium on 6 August to reconnoitre east of the Meuse. Like President Poincare, Messimy would have preferred to send five corps, but this did not meet with Joffre's approval.

Messimy called in General Hirschauer of the engineers on 13 August and ordered him to have the Paris defences ready in 3 weeks, as a precaution. General Gallieni, who had been designated as Joffre's successor "in case of accident" went to Vitry (14 August) to lobby Joffre as Messimy refused to go, believing (wrongly) that Joffre would be more likely to listen to his former superior. Messimy rang GQG on the night of 18/19 August “in anguish” at the weakness of the French left wing. He spoke to General Berthelot, who assured him that the German centre was weak and he agreed that Joffre should not be wakened.

With the French armies falling back in retreat, and the Paris defences still not ready, Messimy sent for Gallieni and offered him the job of Military governor of Paris in place of General Michel. He shook Gallieni's hand effusively and kissed him when he agreed, promising him three active corps to avoid “the fate of Liège and Namur”, asking him to return later when he hoped to have cabinet authority to appoint him. Messimy fully supported Joffre in his purge of unsuccessful generals, even suggesting that, as in 1793, some of them simply ought to be executed.

Messimy then learned from General Ebener, GQG's representative at the War Office, that Joffre had ordered 61st and 62nd Reserve Divisions up from Paris to the Amiens sector (where they would form part of a new Sixth Army under Michel Maunoury). When Messimy protested that Paris was in the Zone of the Interior not the Zone of the Armies, and that the troops could not be moved without the authority of the president, the prime minister and himself, Ebener replied that the move was already “in execution” and that Ebener himself was to command the two divisions. This left Paris guarded by only one reserve division and three territorial divisions. Messimy hung onto 45th Division despite demands from GQG.

Messimy and Poincaré had studied the decrees of 1913 and agreed that in wartime the commander-in-chief had “extended powers” across the whole country and “absolute power”, including over the civilian authorities, in the Zone of the Armies. They wished to avoid a repetition of 1870 when War Minister Palikao had taken charge of strategy, sending Marshal MacMahon on his disastrous mission to be encircled and forced to surrender at Sedan. However Messimy found a clause entitling the civil power to protect “the vital interests of the country” and so, between 2am and 6am he drafted an order to Joffre demanding that he release three corps for the defence of Paris, which he telegraphed and also sent by hand at 11am on 25 August accompanied by a friendly letter.

On 25 August Messimy complained to Joffre that German cavalry were running amok in Belgium and that “Sordet, who has had very little fighting, is asleep. This is inadmissible.” This was unfair criticism.

=== Resignation ===
Messimy now learned that his job was at risk as the price of getting Millerand back into the government (Delcassé was also getting back his old job as Foreign Minister in place of Doumergue). He exploded “to hell with Albania!” at his last cabinet meeting when that country was discussed, and had to be told to calm down by President Poincaré. His last act was to remove General Victor-Constant Michel a second time, this time as military governor of Paris, threatening him with arrest until Viviani arrived (apparently by accident) and persuaded Michel to resign. Messimy himself also refused to resign or to accept the position of minister without portfolio, so the whole government had to resign on 26 August, so Viviani could form a National Unity Government.

Poincaré later wrote that Messimy had been too gloomy, warning of imminent defeat. Greenhalgh writes that he was “temperamentally unsuited … and not strong enough to withstand the strain” of being War Minister.

After his resignation Messimy came to say goodbye to Joffre on 1 September. Joffre told him that he expected to renew the offensive on 8 September at Brienne-le-Chateau, a town between the Marne and the Seine – the counterstroke which would become the First Battle of the Marne. Messimy wrote that he had been impressed by his calm. At the time his feelings may have been less cordial: in late December 1914 he complained to Abel Ferry that Joffre was responsible for the “divorce” between GQG and the troops, and that bad intelligence had been responsible for the near disaster of Charleroi and for Joffre's partial and costly attacks.

== Wartime military service ==
Messimy rejoined the army as a staff captain on the staff of XIV Corps. He soon became head of the deuxième bureau (intelligence) and acted as a liaison officer. He was part of Dubail’s First Army. He was soon promoted to major and made a Chevalier de la Légion d'honneur on 16 November 1914. By 1915 Messimy had been promoted to lieutenant-colonel and on 27 July 1915 he was wounded in the Vosges, leading a unit of Chasseurs Alpins on 27 July 1915. Soon afterwards he was promoted to colonel and was given command of the 6th Chasseurs Half-Brigade.

Messimy and his brigade took part in the Somme Offensive. His brigade was part of Fayolle’s Sixth Army, itself part of Foch's Army Group North. On 4 September it attacked the Bois Reinette, Bois Marries and Bois Madame in front of the German Third Position. Philpott describes this as a “textbook assault”. The lead battalions took the first objectives – a makeshift trench along the track from Ferme de l’Hopital to Cléry and some observation posts on the ridge behind, in one rush. The reserve battalion pushed on in skirmish order into the woods, despite machine gun fire on the left (north). In three hours the brigade had taken 150 prisoners and suffered 670 casualties. As a result of this and other successful French attacks, the Germans pulled back to their Third Position across the southern sector of the Somme front.

The brigade attacked again on 12 September. At 1.05pm Messimy learned that his men had taken the German Third Position west of the Bapaume-Peronne road. He asked for and was sent two more battalions from the 44th and 133rd Infantry Regiments. At 6.39pm they advanced again across the final line of trenches, followed by three companies of chasseurs exploiting without orders, into Bouchavesnes village. By 7.30pm they had taken 500 prisoners and ten guns. A statue of Foch now stands nearby. The German front had been pushed back 3 km, part of a broader Sixth Army advance which took 6 km of the German Third Line. Fayolle, normally highly critical of his subordinates, wrote “Messimy’s spirit was superb”. In common with other French successes on the Somme, this was overshadowed by the Battle of Verdun and received – then and now – less recognition than it deserved. The following day (13 September) the City of Verdun was awarded the Legion d’Honneur and the British Military Cross.

Flanking attacks having failed – Fayolle thought Foch mad to demand a further attack now the German defence was stiffening up – Messimy's brigade attacked the Bois St Pierre Vast from the south-west on 5 November. His men waded through knee-deep mud, but the attack failed and they had to withdraw to the start-line. Messimy issued his final order to his chasseurs on 17 November 1916, praising their performance. The brigade had lost 71 officers and 3000 men.

In early April 1917 Messimy warned Prime Minister Ribot, correctly, that most of the senior generals in Micheler’s Reserve Army Group thought Nivelle’s planned offensive would cause high casualties but would not succeed. Again wounded, Messimy was promoted to général de brigade on 11 September 1917 and transferred to command the 213th Infantry Brigade. He ended the war in command of the 162nd Infantry Division with which he liberated Colmar.

During the war he received eight citations and ended with the rank of général de brigade à titre definitif. He was awarded the Croix de Guerre, and was a Grand Officer of the Légion d'honneur.

== Later political career ==
After the end of the war Messimy re-entered active politics but he was defeated for re-election in 1919. On 15 November he came only sixth out of the list of candidates for the union républicaine et démocratique, receiving only 16,494 votes out of 68,762 cast.

He was elected a senator in 1923 at a by-election caused by the death of Alexandre Bérard. At the second round, held on 10 June, he was convincingly elected with 665 votes out of 871 cast. He was re-elected, this time at the first ballot, on 20 October 1929, with 469 votes out of 877 cast. In the Senate Messimy served on the Committees of the Army, the Air Force, the Colonies and Foreign Affairs. He was president of the Colonies Committee for five years from 1926, before succeeding Albert Lebrun as president of the Army Committee.

He died, still a senator, on 1 September 1935 at Charnoz-sur-Ain from the effects of a cerebral haemorrhage.

In his posthumous memoirs (1937, pp350–1) Messimy once again argued that unsuccessful generals in 1914 should have been executed, quoting the names of six who were sent to the guillotine in 1793–1794.

== Books ==
- Greenhalgh, Elizabeth (2014). The French Army and the First World War. Cambridge University Press. ISBN 978-1-107-60568-8.
- Philpott, W. (2009). Bloody Victory: The Sacrifice on the Somme and the Making of the Twentieth Century. London: Little, Brown. ISBN 978-1-4087-0108-9.
- Terraine, John (1960). Mons, The Retreat to Victory. Wordsworth Military Library, London. ISBN 1-84022-240-9.
- Tuchman, Barbara (1962). The Guns of August. Random House. ISBN 978-0345476098.
- Biography of Messimy on the website of the French Parliament (French)

Political offices
Preceded by Jean Morel	Minister of Overseas France and her Colonies; 1911	Succeeded by Albert Lebrun
Preceded by François Louis Auguste Goiran	Minister of War; 1911-1912	Succeeded by Alexandre Millerand
Preceded by Théophile Delcassé	Minister of War; 1914	Succeeded by Alexandre Millerand
