= Victor Augagneur =

French politician

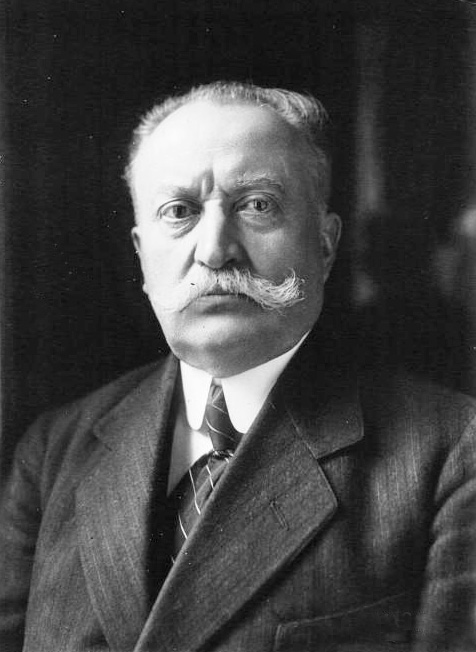
Victor Augagneur

Victor Augagneur (16 May 1855 – 23 April 1931) was a French politician.

Augagneur was born in Lyon. He studied at the seminary of Semur-en-Brionnais before earning a medical degree in 1879. Due in part to his commitment to Alfred Dreyfus during the Dreyfus Affair, Augagneur united the left of Lyon and became the first socialist mayor of Lyon. As part of his tenure as mayor of Lyon, Augagneur replaced indirect taxes (such as the octroi) with direct taxation and improving public health and welfare. His reforms focused on regulating alcohol, expanding municipal services like water supply, healthcare, and street infrastructure. He was the mayor of Lyon from 1900 to 1905, and represented the Independent Socialists in the Chamber of Deputies from 1904 to 1905. He was Governor of Madagascar from 1905 to 1910.

He served once again in the Chamber of Deputies, representing the Republican-Socialist Party from 1910 to 1919. He was Minister of Public Works, Posts and Telegraphs under Prime Minister Joseph Caillaux from 1911 to 1912, then (under Prime Minister Rene Viviani) Minister of National Education in 1914 and Naval Minister from 1914 to 1915.

He was Governor of French Equatorial Africa from 1920 to 1923, then returned once again to the Chamber of Deputies from 1928 to 1931, representing the Independent Radicals. He died in Le Vésinet on 23 April, 1931 and is buried in Paris in the Montparnasse cemetery.
