= Louis Puech =

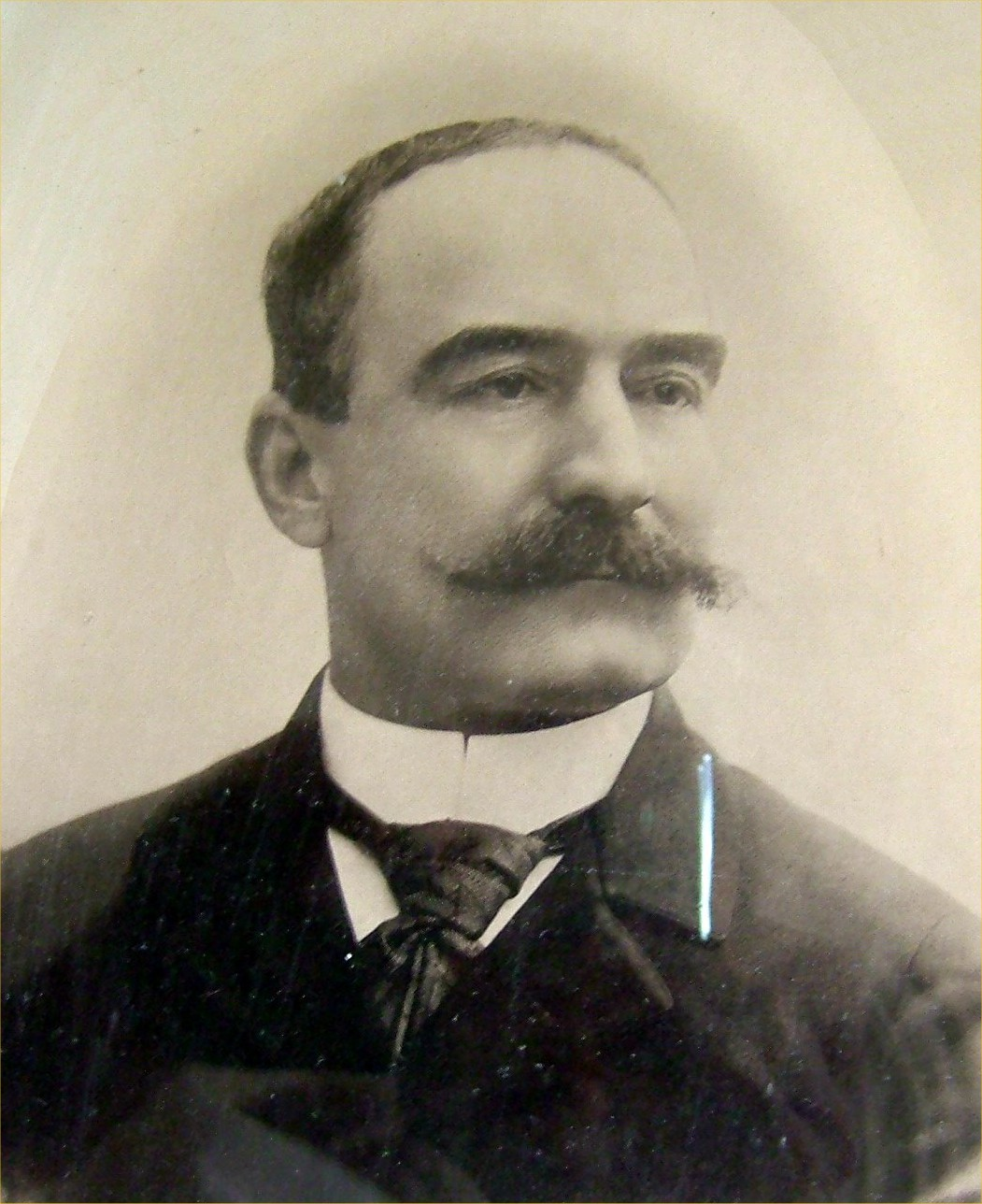
Louis Puech.

Louis Puech (1 May 1851, in Gavernac, Bozouls, Aveyron – 15 July 1947, in Aubignac, Aveyron) was a député of the French Third Republic and Minister of Public Works in the second government of Aristide Briand from 3 November 1910 to 24 February 1911. During his 30 years in office he was inscribed with the group of Républicains de gauche. He was the brother of the sculptor Denys Puech, director of the Villa Médicis (1921–33).

== Life ==
A lawyer by profession, he was noted for pleading in several varied political affairs, notably those of the grévistes of Decazeville (also known as the Watrin affair) and the anarchists Monod and Lucas.

Conseiller municipal for Paris between 1893 and 1898 and a député for the Seine (3rd arrondissement of Paris) from 1898 to 1932, he was known for having denounced the poor care and pitiable monitoring of the archives for France's colonial African administrations, revealing he was in possession of originals which should never have left Africa. His action forced the then Minister for the Colonies to review the organisation of the archives in French West Africa.

He was Minister of Public Works, Posts and Telegraphs from 3 November 1910 to 27 February 1911.

== Sources ==
- Jolly, Jean (1977). "Louis PUECH". Dictionnaire des parlementaires français de 1889 à 1940.
