= Pierre Waldeck-Rousseau =

Prime Minister of France from 1899 to 1902

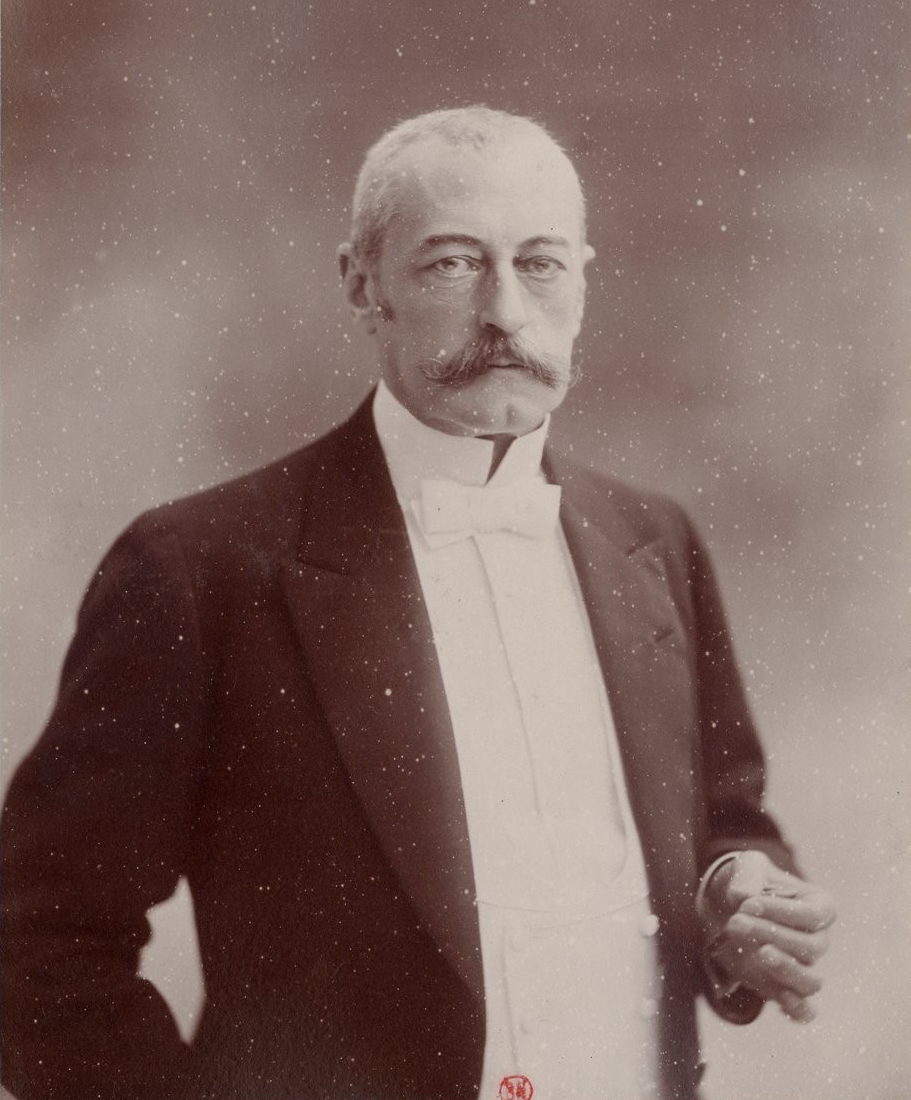
- Waldeck-Rousseau, photographed by Nadar

Prime Minister of France
- In office 22 June 1899 – 7 June 1902
- President: Émile Loubet
- Preceded by: Charles Dupuy
- Succeeded by: Émile Combes

Personal details
- Born: 2 December 1846 Nantes, France
- Died: 10 August 1904 (aged 57) Corbeil-Essonnes, France
- Party: Moderate Republicans Democratic Republican Alliance
- Spouse: Marie Durvis

Pierre Marie René Ernest Waldeck-Rousseau (French: [pjɛʁ valdɛk ʁuso]; 2 December 1846 – 10 August 1904) was a French Republican politician who served as the Prime Minister of France from 1899 to 1902. He served as Minister of the Interior at the same time, having previously occupied the latter office in 1881-1882 and 1883-1885.

== Early life ==
Pierre Waldeck-Rousseau was born in Nantes, Brittany. His father, René Waldeck-Rousseau, an advocate at the Nantes bar and a leader of the local republican party, figured in the revolution of 1848 as one of the deputies elected to the Constituent Assembly for Loire Inférieure.

The son was a delicate child whose eyesight made reading difficult, and his early education was therefore entirely verbal. He studied law at Poitiers and in Paris, where he took his licentiate in January 1869. His father's record ensured his reception in high republican circles. Jules Grévy stood sponsor for him at the Parisian bar. After six months of waiting for briefs in Paris, early in 1870 he decided to return home and join the bar of Saint-Nazaire. In September, when Napoleon III abdicated and a new republic was proclaimed, despite his youth, Waldeck-Rousseau was appointed as clerk to the municipal committee temporarily appointed to carry on the town's business. He organized the National Defence at St Nazaire, and himself marched out with his contingent, though they saw no active service owing to lack of ammunition, their private store having been commandeered by the state.

== Under the Third Republic ==
In 1873, following the establishment of the Third Republic in 1870, Waldeck-Rousseau moved to the bar of Rennes, and six years later was returned to the Chamber of Deputies. In his electoral program he had stated that he was prepared to respect all liberties except those of conspiracy against the institutions of the country and of educating the young in hatred of the modern social order. In the Chamber he joined the Republican Union parliamentary group (Union républicaine) and supported the policy of Léon Gambetta.

The Waldeck-Rousseau family was strictly Catholic in spite of its republican principles; nevertheless, Waldeck-Rousseau supported the Jules Ferry laws on public, laic and mandatory education, enacted in 1881–1882. In 1881 he became minister of the interior in Gambetta's grand ministry. He further voted for the abrogation of the law of 1814 forbidding work on Sundays and fast days, for one year of compulsory military service for seminarists and for the re-establishment of divorce. He made his reputation in the Chamber by a report which he drew up in 1880 on behalf of the committee appointed to inquire into the French judicial system.

=== Capital/labour relations ===
His main preoccupation was with the relations between capital and labour, and had a large share in securing the recognition of trade unions in 1884. He again became minister of the interior in the Jules Ferry cabinet of 1883–1885, when he showed considerable administrative ability. He sought to put down the system by which civil posts were obtained through the local deputy, and he made it clear that the central authority could not be defied by local officials. Waldeck-Rousseau also introduced the bill which became the 27 May 1885 act establishing penal colonies, dubbed "Law on relegation of recidivists", along with Martin Feuillée. The law was supported by Gambetta and his friend, the criminologist Alexandre Lacassagne.

=== Law practice ===
Waldeck-Rousseau had begun to practise at the Paris bar in 1886, and in 1889 he did not seek re-election to the Chamber, but devoted himself to his legal work. The most famous of the many noteworthy cases in which his cold and penetrating intellect and his power of clear exposition were retained was the defense of Gustave Eiffel in the Panama scandals of 1893.

=== Return to political life ===
In 1894 he returned to political life as senator for the department of the Loire, and next year stood for the presidency of the republic against Félix Faure and Henri Brisson, being supported by the Conservatives, who were soon to be his bitter enemies. He received 184 votes, but retired before the second ballot to allow Faure to receive an absolute majority. During the political crisis of the next few years he was recognized by the Opportunist Republicans as the successor of Jules Ferry and Gambetta, and at the crisis of 1899 on the fall of the Charles Dupuy cabinet he was asked by President Émile Loubet to form a government.

=== Coalition cabinet ===
After an initial failure he succeeded in forming a coalition cabinet of "Republican Defense", supported by the Radical-Socialists and the Socialists, which included such widely different politicians as the Socialist Alexandre Millerand and the General de Galliffet, dubbed the "repressor of the Commune". He himself returned to his former post at the ministry of the interior, and set to work to quell the discontent with which the country was seething, to put an end to the various agitations which under specious pretences were directed against republican institutions (far-right leagues, Boulangist crisis, etc.), and to restore independence to the judicial authority. His appeal to all republicans to sink their differences before the common peril met with some degree of success, and enabled the government to allow the second court-martial of Alfred Dreyfus at Rennes a completely free hand, and then to find a compromise by negotiating a presidential pardon for Dreyfus. Waldeck-Rousseau achieved a considerable personal success in October by his successful intervention in the strikes at Le Creusot.

With the condemnation in January 1900 of Paul Deroulède and his nationalist followers by the High Court the worst of the danger was past, and Waldeck-Rousseau kept order in Paris without having recourse to irritating displays of force. The Senate was staunch in support of Waldeck-Rousseau, and in the Chamber he displayed remarkable astuteness in winning support from various groups. The Amnesty Bill, passed on 19 December, chiefly through his unwearied advocacy, went far to smooth down the acerbity of the preceding years. With the object of aiding the industry of wine-producing, and of discouraging the consumption of spirits and other deleterious liquors, the government passed a bill suppressing the octroi duties on the three "hygienic" drinks—wine, cider and beer. The act came into force at the beginning of 1901. A year earlier, in 1900, seats had been mandated for female clerks.

=== Social policy ===
Various reforms were carried out during the course of Waldeck-Rousseau's premiership. Decrees were issued in August 1899 that obliged the state (and allowing communes and departments) to stipulate conditions of work on public contracts such as periods of rest, hours of work, and regional pay scales, while a Department of Labour was set up that same month. A law of March 1900 introduced an 11-hour day in the manufacturing sector. The daily working hours were set at eight in most postal and telegraph sectors, and the creation of a workers' union was authorized. A weekly rest period was also introduced in state-run institutions. In February 1902, a major public health law was passed.

A law was passed in March 1900 that limited the working hours of female workers and young persons under 18 years of age to 10 daily hours of “travail effectif.” The Higher Council of Labor was turned into a tripartite body composed of employer and worker representatives alongside members of parliament, with the aim to (as noted by one study) “strengthen the fruitful collaboration of workers, employers, and the government" in "scientific inquiries followed by adversarial discussions." Departmental councils were encouraged (as noted by one study) “to introduce direct representatives of employers and workers into the departmental labor commissions associated with the labor inspectorate.” A suggestion to cover the travel expenses of the worker representatives was also accepted by 35 departmental councils, while workplace inspections were encouraged. Regional labor councils were also organized via decrees made in September 1900 and January 1901. One study from 1910 noted the importance of the new labour councils as follows:

The labour councils, which are composed equally of representatives of employers and workers, advise, at the request of those concerned or of the Government, on all questions regarding conditions of work, and take part in inquiries ordered into them. For every district and the branches of industry that they represent, they fix the standard of wages and hours, and this fixing at once governs contracts of work or supplies for the State, or, in certain cases, for other public authorities. They make suggestions for the allotment and expenditure of the public grants to trade organizations. They investigate the causes of prevailing unemployment, and suggest remedies to the authorities. They report annually on the state of the protection of workers, and the execution of laws, decrees, and instructions concerning labour; and suggest improvements.

=== Associations Bill of 1901 ===
The most important measure of Waldeck-Rousseau's later administration was the Associations Bill of 1901. With his anti-clerical sentiment, he was convinced that the stability of the republic demanded restraining religious associations. All previous attempts in this direction had failed. In his speech in the Chamber, Waldeck-Rousseau recalled the fact that he had tried to pass an Associations Bill in 1882 and again in 1883. He declared that religious associations were now being subjected for the first time to the regulations common to all others and that the object of the bill was to ensure the supremacy of the civil power. Royalist sympathies given to the pupils in the religious seminaries was a principal cause of the passing of this bill, and the government took strong measures to secure the presence of officers of undoubted fidelity to the republic in the higher positions on the staff. His speeches on the religious question were published in 1901 under the title of Associations et congregations, following a volume of speeches on Questions sociales (1900).

All Conservative parties opposed Waldeck-Rousseau's policies, especially the mass closure of church schools, as a persecution of religion. He led the anti-clerical coalition on the left, facing opposition primarily organized by the pro-Catholic Action libérale populaire, (ALP). The ALP had a stronger popular base, with better financing and a stronger network of newspapers, but had far fewer seats in parliament.

As the general election of 1902 approached, all sections of the Opposition united their efforts under the Bloc des gauches, and the name of Waldeck-Rousseau served as a battle-cry for one side, and on the other as a target for abuse. The result was a decisive victory for the left and Waldeck-Rousseau considered his task ended. Therefore, on 3 June 1902 he resigned office, having proved himself the "strongest personality in French politics since the death of Gambetta."

He emerged from his retirement to protest in the Senate against the construction put on his Associations Bill by Émile Combes, who refused en masse the applications of the teaching and preaching congregations for official recognition.

== Death ==
In January 1904, Waldeck-Rousseau announced that he was suffering from "calculus of the liver". In May, he underwent surgery, — and, as was later revealed, attempted suicide. He died on August 11, 1904, after further surgery.

== Publication of speeches ==
His speeches were published as Discours parlementaires (1889); Pour la République, 1883–1903 (1904), edited by H Leyret; L'État et la liberté (1906); and his Plaidoyers (1906) were edited by H Barboux. See also H Leyret, Waldeck-Rousseau et la Troisième République (1908).

== Honours ==
- Norway: Order of St. Olav (grade unknown) – July 1902 – during a lunch with King Oscar II of Sweden and Norway.

== Waldeck-Rousseau's ministry, 22 June 1899 – 7 June 1902 ==
- Pierre Waldeck-Rousseau – President of the Council and Minister of the Interior and Worship
- Théophile Delcassé – Minister of Foreign Affairs
- Marquis de Galliffet – Minister of War
- Joseph Caillaux – Minister of Finance
- Ernest Monis – Minister of Justice
- Jean-Marie de Lanessan – Minister of the Navy
- Georges Leygues – Minister of Public Instruction and Fine Arts
- Jean Dupuy – Minister of Agriculture
- Albert Decrais – Minister of Colonies
- Pierre Baudin – Minister of Transport
- Alexandre Millerand – Minister of Commerce, Industry, Posts, and Telegraphs

Changes

- 20 May 1900 – Louis André succeeds Gallifet as Minister of War.

== In popular culture ==
Waldeck-Rousseau appears in council with President Loubet in The Master Key (1901), an urban fantasy novel by L. Frank Baum, where his rank as interior minister is anachronistically referred to as minister of police.

== See also ==
- History of the Left in France

Political offices
Preceded by Charles Dupuy	Prime Minister of France; 1899–1902	Succeeded by Émile Combes
