= Minister of Public Works, Posts and Telegraphs =

The Minister of Public Works, Posts and Telegraphs (French: Ministre des Travaux publics, des Postes et des Télégraphes) in the French cabinet was responsible from 25 October 1906 to 22 March 1913 for a combined portfolio formerly divided between the Minister of Public Works and the Minister of Posts, Telegraphs, and Telephones. On 22 March 1913 in the cabinet of Louis Barthou responsibility was divided between the Minister of Public Works and the Minister of Commerce, Industry, Posts, and Telegraphs.

== Officeholders ==
Start	End	Officeholder	Notes
25 October 1906	24 July 1909	Louis Barthou	First cabinet of Georges Clemenceau. Minister of Public Works, Posts, and Telegraphs
24 July 1909	3 November 1910	Alexandre Millerand	First cabinet of Aristide Briand
3 November 1910	27 February 1911	Louis Puech	Second cabinet of Aristide Briand
2 March 1911	27 June 1911	Charles Dumont	Cabinet of Ernest Monis
27 June 1911	10 January 1912	Victor Augagneur	Cabinet of Joseph Caillaux
21 January 1912	21 January 1913	Jean Dupuy	First cabinet of Raymond Poincaré
21 January 1913	22 March 1913	Jean Dupuy	Third and fourth cabinets of Aristide Briand

== Sources ==
- "Etienne Clémentel". Assemblée Nationale.
- Jolly, Jean (1977). "Charles DUMONT". Dictionnaire des parlementaires français de 1889 à 1940.
- Jolly, Jean (1977b). "Louis PUECH". Dictionnaire des parlementaires français de 1889 à 1940.
- Jolly, Jean (1977c). "Victor, Jean AUGAGNEUR". Dictionnaire des parlementaires français de 1889 à 1940.
