= Pierre Baudin =

French politician

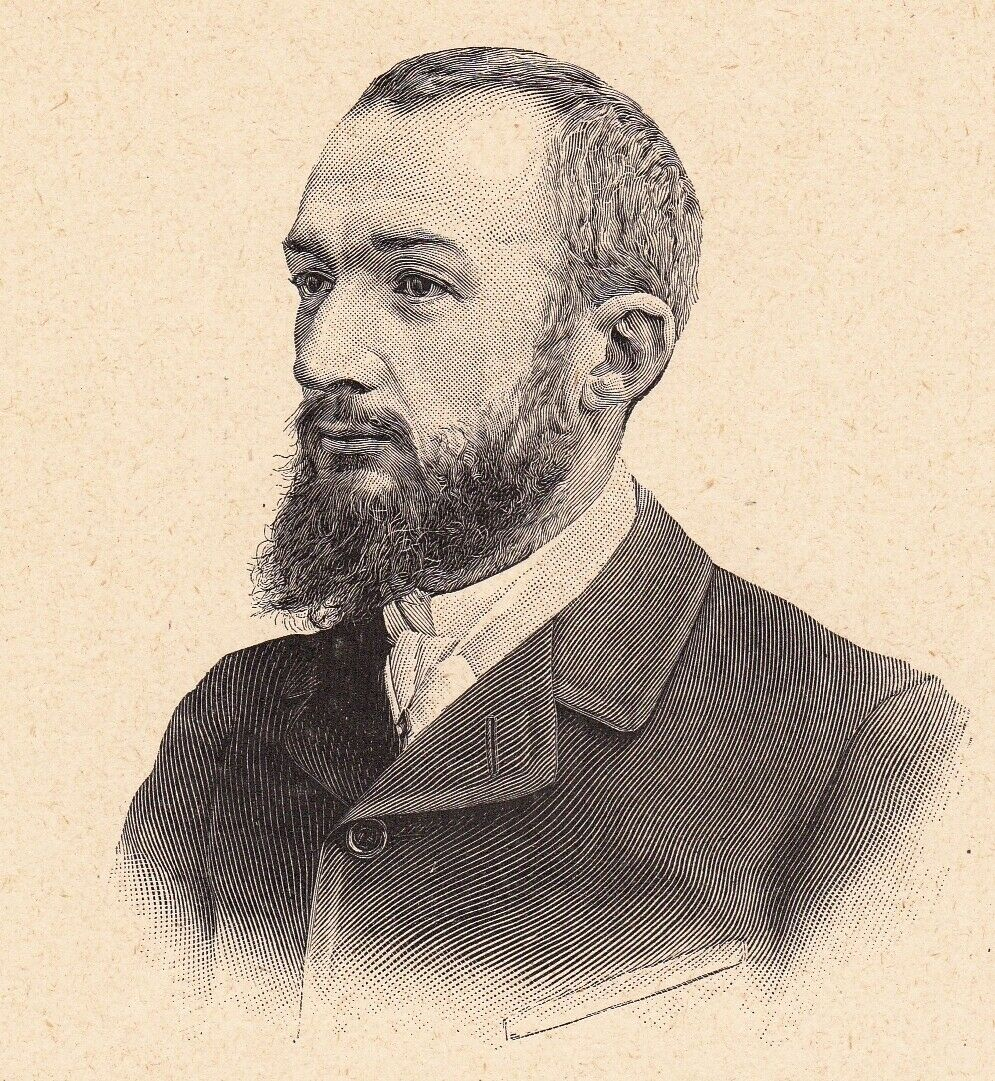
Pierre Baudin

Pierre Baudin (21 August 1863 in Nantua – 30 July 1917 in Paris) was a French radical-socialist politician.

In 1899, Baudin became the Minister of Public Works, serving in the cabinet of Pierre Waldeck-Rousseau.

== Sources ==
- http://www.senat.fr/senateur-3eme-republique/baudin_pierre0016r3.html
