= Émile Roche =

French politician

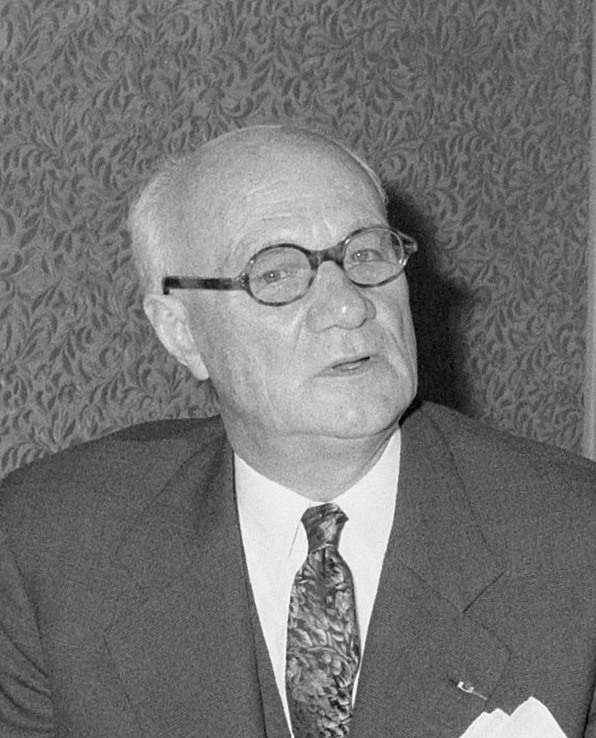
Émile Roche in 1963

Émile Roche (Estaires, 24 September 1893 – 1990), was a French economist, radical politician and journalist.

He was born the son of a grocer, who entered politics after the First World War. He was best known as a supporter of the politician Joseph Caillaux from 1927 during the 1930s through the newspaper he founded La République. Under the German Occupation, Émile Roche wrote for the collaborationist newspaper Les Nouveaux Temps where he criticised the parties of the 1930s and supported the single party. After the Liberation he intervened on behalf of the former German ambassador to Vichy, Otto Abetz in 1950. From 1954 to 1974 he was the Président of the French Conseil économique. He was also well known as a distinguished collector of art.
