= Liotard =

Liotard is a surname, and may refer to:

- Jean-Étienne Liotard (1702–1789), Genevan painter
- Kartika Liotard (1971–2020), Dutch politician and Member of the European Parliament
- Thérèse Liotard (1946–2026), French actress
