= François Louis Auguste Goiran =

French soldier and politician

General François Goiran
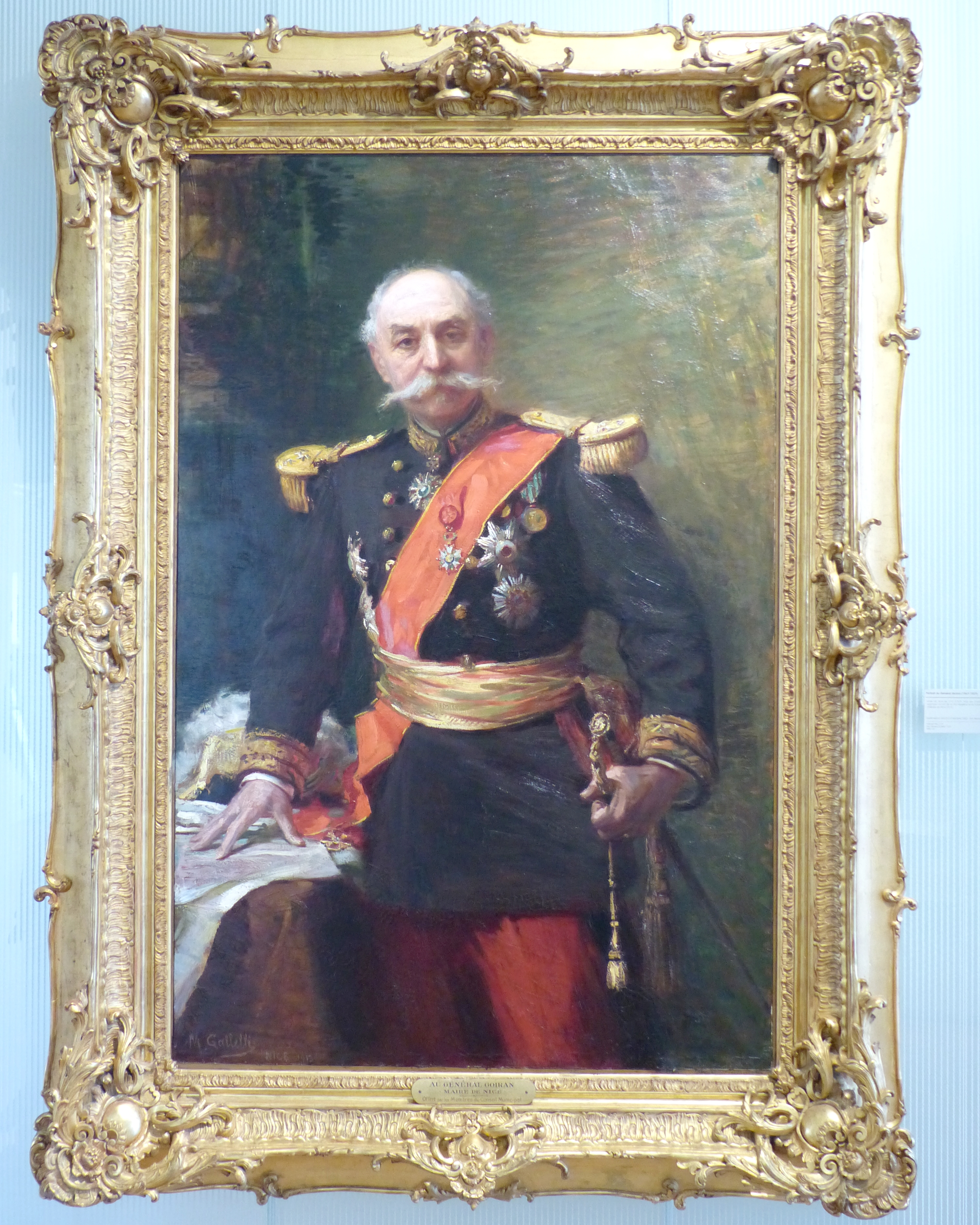
- Portrait of Goiran in 1913

François Louis Auguste Goiran (27 April 1847, Nice – 4 April 1927, Johannesburg) was a French soldier and politician. He was Minister of War from May to June 1911 and Mayor of Nice from 1912 to 1919.
