= Ministries of France =

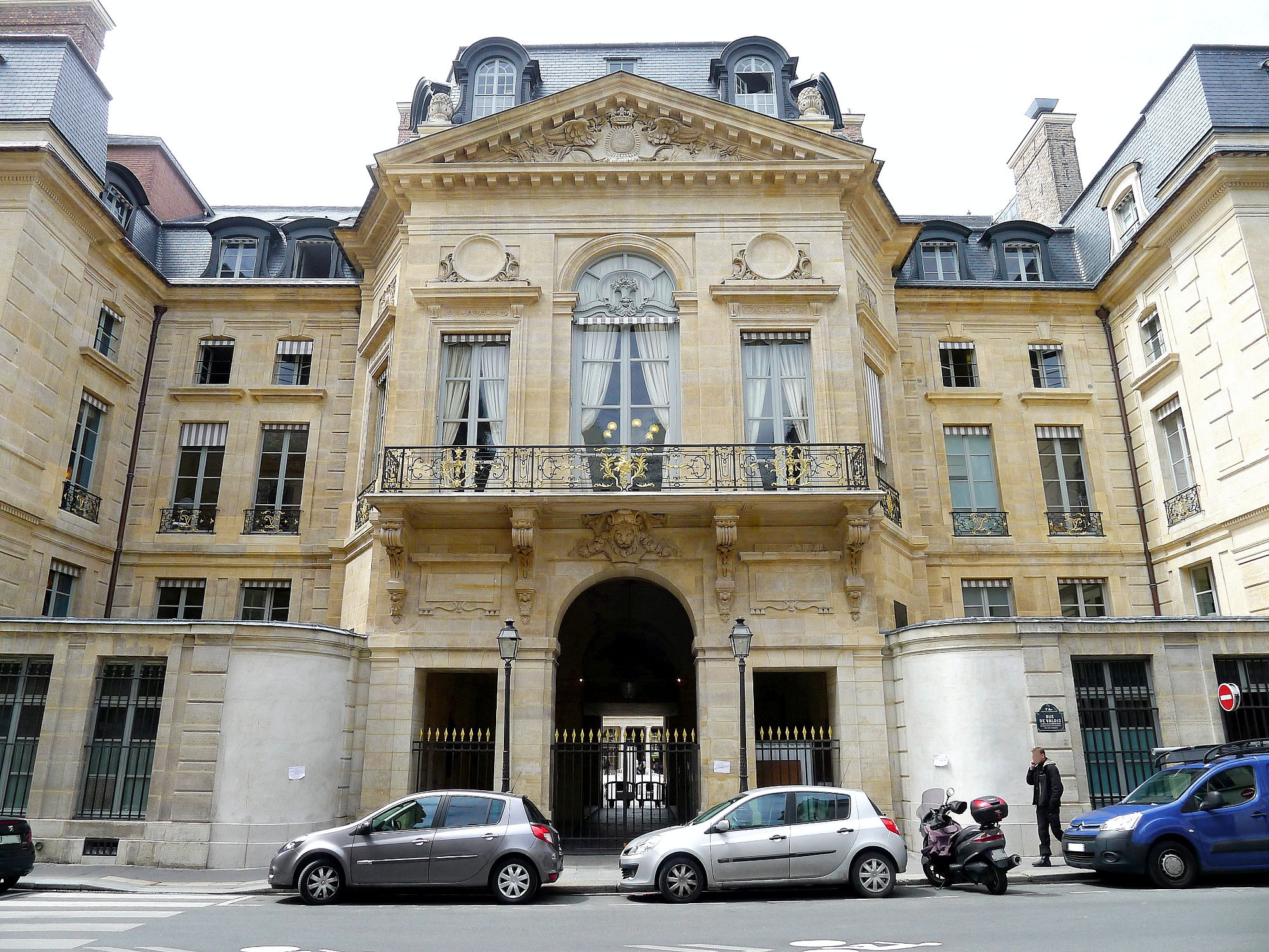
The Ministry of Culture in Paris

In France, a ministry (French: ministère) is a division of the central government (French central public administration) responsible for implementing government policy in a specific area. The minister, a member of the government who heads the ministry, is appointed by the President of the Republic. They are assisted by a cabinet and have authority over the state administrations.

== History ==
=== Ancien Régime (17th-18th centuries) ===
Under the Ancien Régime, the king governed with the help of his ministers. These ministers were appointed by the king to manage different aspects of the administration. Examples include the Ministry of War, the Ministry of Finance, and the Ministry of Foreign Affairs. These ministries played a crucial role in the exercise of royal power and in the management of state affairs.

=== French Revolution (1789-1799) ===
The French Revolution ended the absolute monarchy and established the First Republic in 1792. The ministerial system underwent major changes during this period. Ministers were now chosen by and accountable to the National Assembly. The role of ministries also expanded to reflect the new republican values.

Under the National Constituent Assembly, the law of April 27–May 25, 1791 abolished four existing secretaries of state —namely: the Secretary of State for War, the Secretary of State for the Navy, the Secretary of State for Foreign Affairs, and the Secretary of State for the King's Household—and replaced them with six ministers—namely: the Minister of Justice, the Minister of War, the Minister of the Navy, the Minister of the Interior, the Minister of Public Contributions and Revenues, and the Minister of Foreign Affairs —whose responsibilities it defined. The creation of ministries thus fell under the purview of the legislature.

Under the French Directory, Article article 150 of the Constitution of the Year III (22/8/1795) reserves to the Legislative Body is to say to the Council of Five Hundred and to that of Ancients — the determination of the powers of the ministers and their number, the latter being to be at least six and at most eight.

=== First Empire (1804-1814) ===
Napoleon Bonaparte established the First French Empire and reorganized the government by creating modern ministries with a more formal structure. He appointed ministers responsible for areas such as the Interior, Justice, War, Finance, and so on. These ministers were directly accountable to Napoleon and played a vital role in the administration of the Empire.

=== Restoration and July Monarchy (1815-1848) ===
After Napoleon's fall, the Bourbon Restoration brought back the monarchy to France, followed by the July Monarchy. The ministerial system was reinstated, and the various regimes had different configurations, but the core ministries were maintained, such as Foreign Affairs, the Interior and Finance.

=== Second Republic (1848-1852) ===
The Second Republic was proclaimed in 1848, and a provisional government was established. The existing ministries were reorganized, and new ministries were created to meet the needs of the fledgling republic.

Under Article article 66 of the French Constitution of 1848, the determination of the number of ministers and their responsibilities is reserved to the legislative power, to the National Legislative Assembly. The creation of ministries thus falls within the purview of the legislature.

=== Second Empire (1852-1870) ===
Napoleon III established the Second Empire and appointed ministers to help him govern. The ministries were reorganized to strengthen the Emperor's power, and some ministries were merged to create greater centralization.

=== Third Republic (1870-1940) ===
After the fall of the Second Empire in 1870, the French Third Republic was proclaimed. French ministries were reorganized to meet the requirements of a parliamentary republic. The Third Republic lasted until the German invasion of 1940 during World War II. During this period, the ministries played a vital role in the stability and governance of the country.

No provision of the constitutional laws of 1875 did not reserve to the legislature the role to determine the number and responsibilities of ministers to the Chamber of Deputies and the Senate. Under the presidency of Jules Grévy, by decrees of 14 November 1881 by Léon Gambetta, President of the Council, saw the creation of three ministries: the Ministry of Agriculture, the Ministry of Posts and the Ministry of Arts. The French legal doctrine, as set forth by Eugène Pierre, was that every deputy had the right to introduce a bill to decide either the creation or the abolition of a ministry, or that in the future, the number and responsibilities of the various ministries would be fixed by law.

Article article 8 of the law of 20 June 1920 entrusted to the French Parliament "the creation of ministries" and "the transfer of responsibilities from one ministerial department to another". However it would never be effectively implemented and will be repealed by Article article 2 of Law No. 45-01 on 24 November 1945.

=== Fourth Republic (1946-1958) ===
After the end of World War II, the French Fourth Republic was established, and French ministries continued to play a central role in government. However, the Fourth Republic faced governing instability.

=== Fifth Republic (since 1958) ===
In 1958, the French Fifth Republic was established with the adoption of a new constitution. This new system strengthened the role of the president, who appoints the prime minister and ministers. The ministries became more intrenched, and their structure has remained largely unchanged since then.

The titles and positions of ministries in the official hierarchy often reflect the policies pursued by each government. Similarly, the creation, modification, and (rare) merging of ministries correspond to societal changes: the merger of the Ministries of Urban Planning and Public Works to form the Ministry of Equipment in 1966, the creation of the Ministry of the Environment in the 1970s, the creation of the Ministry of Women's Rights in 1981, and the creation of the Ministry of the Social Economy.

Since the 1980s, many political figures have promised a "smaller government", but during the Fifth Republic, few governments have had fewer than 30 members. Similarly, some politicians have wanted ministries to remain permanent. Under the presidency of Nicolas Sarkozy, the Balladur Committee, chaired by Édouard Balladur, after noting that the number of ministries is generally higher in France than in other democracies, nevertheless considered it "neither useful nor appropriate to stipulate that an organic law would determine the structure of the Government". It was also known as the Committee for Reflection and Proposals on the Modernization and Rebalancing of the Institutions. The Committee recommended that the President of France and the Prime Minister of France should have the ability to adapt the governmental structure to current problems and to the reform of the State. It did not advocate for setting a maximum number of members of the Government by law. But in 2008, a draft constitutional revision proposed to limit the number of ministers, but this provision of the draft was rejected by the National Assembly.

== Permanent structures and variable structures ==
However, the Constitution mentions a whole list of positions, including prefects, rectors of academies, and directors of central government departments. Thus, the Constitution implicitly recognizes a whole series of ministerial structures: central government departments, prefectures (and therefore, indirectly, the decentralized government departments headed by the prefect), and academies.

The number of ministries is not fixed by the Constitution or by French law. The existence of ministries results from decrees issued "Décret en Conseil d'État". These decrees remain in force permanently, even if the first act of the executive branch, namely the formation of the government, modifies their responsibilities, structure, and name. At that time, mergers or separations may occur, formalized by new constitutive or amending decrees.

The Council of State ensures the continuity of government ministries: any modification must be submitted to it, and, as the supreme administrative court, it must know which ministry to contact to enforce one of its decisions, relating to a long-standing problem that sometimes arose long before the ministry existed, or even before the birth of the French Fifth Republic contingencies of naming are addressed in two ways:

- the use of the phrase "chargé de": thus there will always be a ministry "chargé des anciens combattants", even if nothing in the government structure reminds us of this.
- For major ministries, the use of a permanent name, independent of the vicissitudes of speech: thus the council recognizes a "ministry of the interior" or a "ministry of agriculture", although their official names, their responsibilities and their names have changed several times.

== Function ==
Within the executive branch, powers initially concentrated at the top are gradually distributed through:

- the creation, by law or decree, of autonomous structures with specialized powers: the government entrusts to other bodies (state public institutions, for example) certain powers that it holds;
- the creation of the government, by which the prime minister provides the ministers with powers and areas of action, with the responsibility for managing the gaps and collisions if necessary;
- The delegation, by each minister, of the powers vested in him to other persons, since the minister cannot do everything. This is how ministries are created.

Ministries have two basic functions:

- designing and supervising policies and their implementation (the normative texts, laws, regulations and decisions that materialize them): this is the task of the central administration;
- Implementing these policies: that is the role of decentralized services or services with national jurisdiction (National Service).

In addition, ministries manage resources (personnel, money, etc.) and provide oversight or control, within their areas of competence, of bodies with their own powers or competencies.

== Internal organization ==
=== The minister and the cabinet ===
==== The minister ====
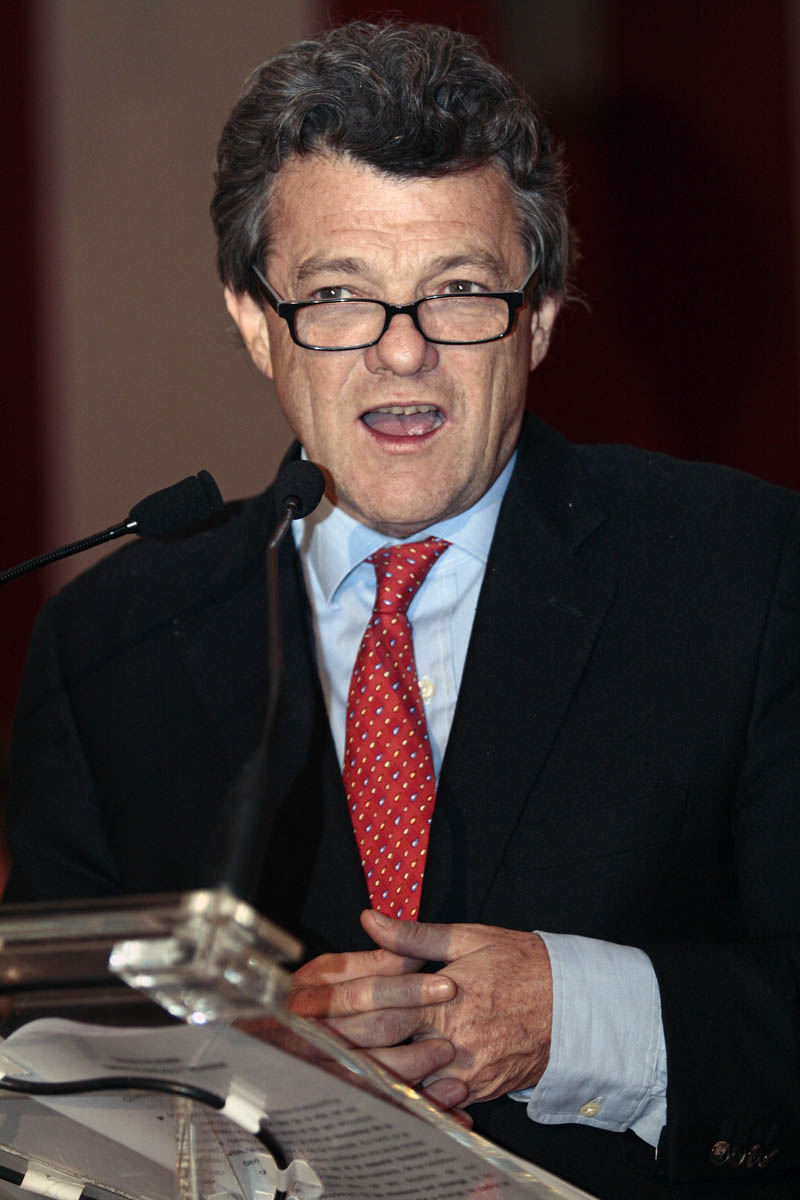
Jean-Louis Borloo was Minister Delegate between 2002 and 2004, Minister between 2004 and 2007 and then Minister of State from 2007 to 2010 (governments of Jean-Pierre Raffarin, Dominique de Villepin and François Fillon).

At the head of the ministry is the minister (or minister of state). The recent regrouping of ministries detached over time from the Ministry of the Interior into "super-ministries" has led to the multiplication of junior ministers, secretaries of state or ministers attached to a minister, who are entrusted with the supervision of a sector of the ministry.

On the proposal of the Prime Minister, the President of the Republic appoints the other members of the Government and terminates their functions (Article 8 of the Constitution). Appointments to the executive are made by decree.

The functions of a member of the Government are incompatible with the exercise of any parliamentary mandate, any function of professional representation of a national nature and any public employment or any professional activity (Article 23 of the Constitution).

The powers of each minister are set by decrees deliberated in the council of ministers, after consultation with the Conseil d'État, as well as the administrations over which he has authority, and those at his disposal and to which he appeals.

Members of the Government have access to both houses of the French Parliament (National Assembly and Senate). They are able to contact when they request it (Article 31 of the Constitution).

Ministers' remuneration has, since 2012, been 1.4 times the average of the highest and lowest salaries received by civil servants in state jobs classified in the "hors échelle" category.

"The Government determines and conducts the policy of the Nation. It has at its disposal the administration and the armed forces"

— Article 20 of the Constitution

==== The cabinet ====
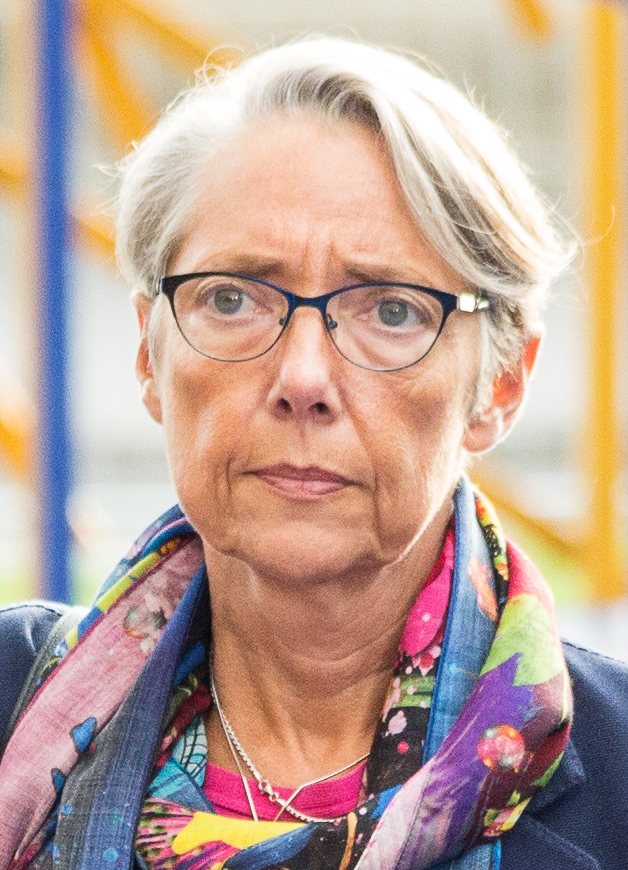
From 2014 to 2015, Élisabeth Borne was chief of staff to Ségolène Royal, Minister of the Environment, Energy and the Sea, before becoming a minister herself in 2019. This was also the case for Dominique de Villepin (chief of staff to Alain Juppé from 1993 to 1995, before becoming a minister himself between 2002 and 2005).

The minister is assisted in his duties by ministerial staff, which comprises between ten and twenty people. These are either close political associates who have worked with the minister for a long time (former parliamentary assistants, activists, or staff members in a local town hall), or senior civil servants recruited from within the administration who have chosen to make their mark politically. The chief of staff is generally drawn from this latter category. The fate of the staff members is directly linked to the minister, and if the minister changes positions, all members are generally replaced, the minister's loyalists follow him, and the civil servants return to their positions within the administration. Since 2001, staff members have received "allowances for special duties" included in their pay slips (previously, these bonuses were paid in cash and were not declared).

Each year, an annex to the draft budget bill, the "budgetary yellow book", details the staffing levels in ministerial offices. According to Socialist MP René Dosière, the cost of a minister and their staff (during François Fillon) was €17 million per year. The largest item was personnel.

=== Civil administration ===
"State councillors, the Grand Chancellor of the Legion of Honour, ambassadors and extraordinary envoys, senior advisors to the Court of Auditors, prefects, representatives of the State in the overseas collectivities […] and in New Caledonia, general officers, rectors of academies, and directors of central administrations are appointed by the Council of Ministers"

— Article 13 of the Constitution

The following table details the responsibilities of each minister in the Lecornu II government.

Placed under the authority of the Prime Minister and each of the ministers, the civil administrations of the State consist, on the one hand, of central administrations and national services, and on the other hand, of decentralized services. The distribution of missions between the central administrations, national services, and decentralized services is organized according to a number of conventions. Only those missions of a national nature or whose execution cannot be delegated to a territorial level are entrusted to the central administrations and national services. Other missions, and in particular those concerning relations between the State and local authorities, are entrusted to the decentralized services.

==== Central Administration ====
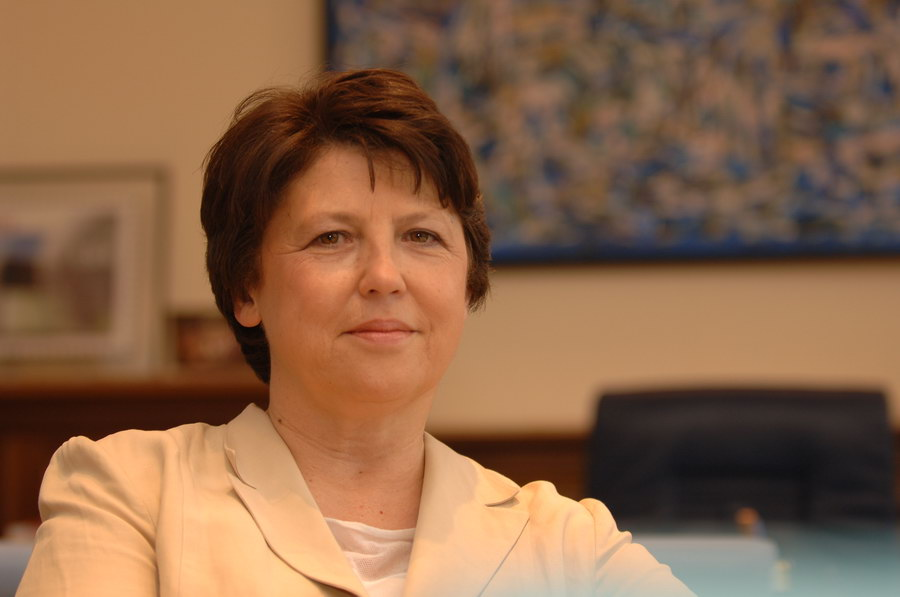
Martine Aubry worked in the administration of the Ministry of Labour and was director of labour relations between 1984 and 1987, before becoming Minister of Labour, Employment and Vocational Training between 1991 and 1993 (Cresson and then Bérégovoy), then Minister of Employment and Solidarity between 1997 and 2000 (Jospin government).

The French central public administration governs the central government. The Secretary General is responsible for the overall coordination of services and the modernization of the ministry. By order of the Minister, the Secretary General may be assigned specific coordination tasks relating to certain issues or the activities of certain departments. The organization of each ministry's central services into directorates general, directorates, and departments is established by decree; their organization into sub-directorates is established by an order of the relevant Minister.

Each minister is assisted by a senior defense and security official, a senior official for sustainable development, and a ministerial standards officer, responsible for implementing standards within the ministry's scope.

Missions, delegations, and commissions generally refer to smaller, less permanent services tasked with a policy portfolio or specific mission. Interministerial commissions also work on cross-section issues.

Finally, the Inspection Service has a direct link to the minister due to the specific missions entrusted to them.

Central government departments play a key role at the national level in policy design, coordination, guidance, evaluation, and oversight. To this end, they participate in drafting bills and decrees and prepare and implement the decisions of the Government and each of the ministers. Bound by the principle of impartiality in the civil service, the administration embodies the continuity of the State, regardless of the ruling majority.

National services may be entrusted with management functions, technical studies or training, production of goods or provision of services as well as any other operational mission of a national nature corresponding to the responsibilities of the minister under whose authority they are placed.

Members of the government, members of ministerial cabinets and any other person holding a position appointed by the Council of Ministers shall send a declaration of assets and a declaration of interests to the President of the Haute Autorité pour la transparence de la vie publique.

During the formation of the First Philippe government, it was clarified that the respective tasks of members of ministerial cabinets and directors of central administration: cabinets "must focus on political functions and ensure the explanation of actions and related communication", while directors of central administration "are responsible for implementing public policies within the framework of government action". It was recommended against duplicating administrative functions within the cabinet.

==== Decentralized services ====
See: List of decentralized services of the French State

To carry out their missions, the decentralised services of the civil administrations of the State are, unless otherwise provided by law or as provided by decree in the Council of State, organised within the framework of three types of territorial districts across Metropolitan France: region, department or arrondissement.

The regional constituency is the territorial level:

- The implementation of national and community policies on economic and social development and spatial planning;
- The coordination and organisation of state policies relating to culture, the environment, the city and rural areas;
- The coordination of policies of all kinds concerning several departments in the region.

The departmental district is the territorial level for implementing policies from the national government as well as the European Union. The arrondissement is the territorial framework for promoting local development and local administrative action by the State. The prefect of the department implements national and European Union policies. He has authority over the heads of the decentralized services at the departmental level of the State's civil administrations. The sub-prefect of the arrondissement is the prefect's delegate in the arrondissement.

For example, the rectorate and the departmental directorate of national education services are the decentralized services of the Ministry of National Education.

The services of departmental councils and regional councils do not fall into this category; they are territorial collectivities.

== Consideration of sustainable development goals ==
In the organization of ministries, the consideration of sustainable development objectives differs depending on whether one is interested in the internal functioning of the ministries, or in public policies.

=== Public policies ===
Sustainable development objectives concerning actors external to the ministries and their supervised establishments, i.e. falling under the public policies of the State, are taken into account by the major directorates of the ministries, for example, for the Ministry of Agriculture, by the Directorate General for the Economic and Environmental Performance of Enterprises (DGPE), the Directorate General for Food (DGAL), and the Directorate General for Education and Research (DGER)..

== List of ministries ==
Ministry
Prime Minister
Ministry of National Education
Ministry for Overseas Territories
Ministry of Justice
Ministry of the Interior
Ministry of the Armed Forces
Ministry of Culture
Ministry of Economics, Finance and Industrial and Digital Sovereignty
Ministry of Labour, Employment and Economic Inclusion
Ministry of Health
Ministry for Europe and Foreign Affairs
Ministry of Partnership with Territories and Decentralization
Ministry of Housing and Urban Renovation
Ministry of Ecological Transition
Ministry of Agriculture
Ministry of Public Action and Accounts
Ministry of Transport
Ministry of Sports, Youth and Community Life

As of 31 December 2022, the French civil service had a workforce of 5,694,000 employees, of which 2,543,000 are in the state civil service, who are assigned either to a ministry proper or to a public administrative establishment (EPA).

== Budget allocation ==
The state budget represents a portion of public finances (along with the social security budget and the budgets of local authorities). It is set in the annual finance laws (initial laws which may be followed by amending laws).

The budget is divided between missions and programmes. Their allocations may differ from those of the ministries (particularly for the State's external action, school education and civil security).

In 2014, the general budget provided for resources of 227 billion euros and expenditures of 309 billion euros.

== Ministerial office headquarters ==
Ministerial offices are generally located in former Parisian townhouses, sometimes housing the directors of central government departments. The premises include offices and occasionally official residences.

With each change of government, the General Secretariat of the Government allocates a seat to each ministerial cabinet.

Ministerial offices
Place	Address	Use	Image
Hôtel de Matignon	57 Rue de Varenne 7th arrondissement of Paris	Office and services of the Prime Minister (since 1935, when it was the Presidency of the Council)	
Hôtel de Rothelin-Charolais	101 Rue de Grenelle 7th arrondissement of Paris	Office of the Ministry of the Civil Service	
Hôtel de Clermont	69 Rue de Varenne7th arrondissement of Paris	Office of the Ministry of Relations with Parliament	
Hôtel de Castries	72 Rue de Varenne 7th arrondissement of Paris	Office of the Government Spokesperson	
Hôtel de Villeroy	78 Rue de Varenne 7th arrondissement of Paris	Ministry of Agriculture (since 1881)	
Hôtel de Rochechouart	110 Rue de Grenelle 7th arrondissement of Paris	Ministry of National Education (since 1829)	
Hôtel du Châtelet	127 Rue de Grenelle 7th arrondissement of Paris	Ministry of Labour (since 1906)	
Hôtel de Brienne	14-16 Rue Saint-Dominique 7th arrondissement of Paris	Offices of the Ministry of the Armed Forces (since 1817, then the Ministry of War), the Secretary of State for Youth and Universal National Service, and the Secretary of State for Veterans and Remembrance	
Ensemble Fontenoy-Ségur	20 Avenue de Ségur 7th arrondissement of Paris	Offices of the Ministry of the Sea, Ministry of the Family, Administration of the Ministry of Territorial Cohesion, and services of the Prime Minister.	
Hôtel du petit Monaco	55 Rue Saint-Dominique 7th arrondissement of Paris	Office of the Minister for Gender Equality, Diversity and Equal Opportunities (since May 2017)	
Hôtel du ministre des Affaires étrangères	37 Quai d'Orsay 7th arrondissement of Paris	Office of the Ministry for Foreign Affairs (since 1856) and the Minister for European Affairs	
Ancien site de l'Imprimerie nationale	27 Rue de la Convention 15th arrondissement of Paris	Offices of the Minister Delegate for Foreign Trade, Economic Attractiveness and French Nationals Abroad, Secretary of State for Development, Francophonie and International Partnerships	
Hôtel de Roquelaure	246 Boulevard Saint-Germain 7th arrondissement of Paris	Offices of the Minister for Ecological Transition and Territorial Development, Minister for Energy Transition, Minister Delegate for Housing and Secretary of State for Biodiversity	
Hôtel Le Play	40 Rue du Bac 7th arrondissement of Paris	Office of the Ministry of Transport	
Ministry of Health	14 Avenue Duquesne 7th arrondissement of Paris	Offices and departments of the Ministry of Health and Prevention, the Minister of Solidarity and Families, the Minister Delegate for Territorial Organization and Health Professions, and the Minister Delegate for Persons with Disabilities	
Hôtel de Montmorin	7 Rue Oudinot 7th arrondissement of Paris	Ministry of Overseas Territories (since 1910, then Ministry of Colonies)	
Hôtel de Bourvallais	11, 13 Place Vendôme 30, 34, 36 Rue Cambon 1th arrondissement of Paris	Ministry of Justice (since 1718, then chancellery)	
Palais-Royal	Place du Palais-Royal 1 to 7 Rue de Valois 2 to 8 Rue de Montpensier Place Colette 1st arrondissement of Paris	Ministry of Culture and Communication (since 1959 - also houses the Conseil d'État and the Constitutional Council)	
Site of the former college of Navarre, college of Boncourt, College of Tournai, and later the École polytechnique	1-21 Rue Descartes 2-8 Rue Clovis 48-58 Rue du Cardinal-Lemoine 12-14 Rue d'Arras 22 Rue Monge 33-52 Rue des Bernardins 17-25 Rue de la Montagne-Sainte-Geneviève 5th arrondissement of Paris	Ministry of Higher Education (houses the Research administration since 1981)	
Hôtel de Beauvau	Place Beauvau 8th arrondissement of Paris	Minister of the Interior (since 1861)	
Buildings at Bercy	139 Rue de Bercy 12th arrondissement of Paris	Ministry of Economy and Finance (since 1988)	
Building at Avenue de France	95 Avenue de France 13th arrondissement of Paris	Office and administration of the Minister of Sport and the Olympic and Paralympic Games	

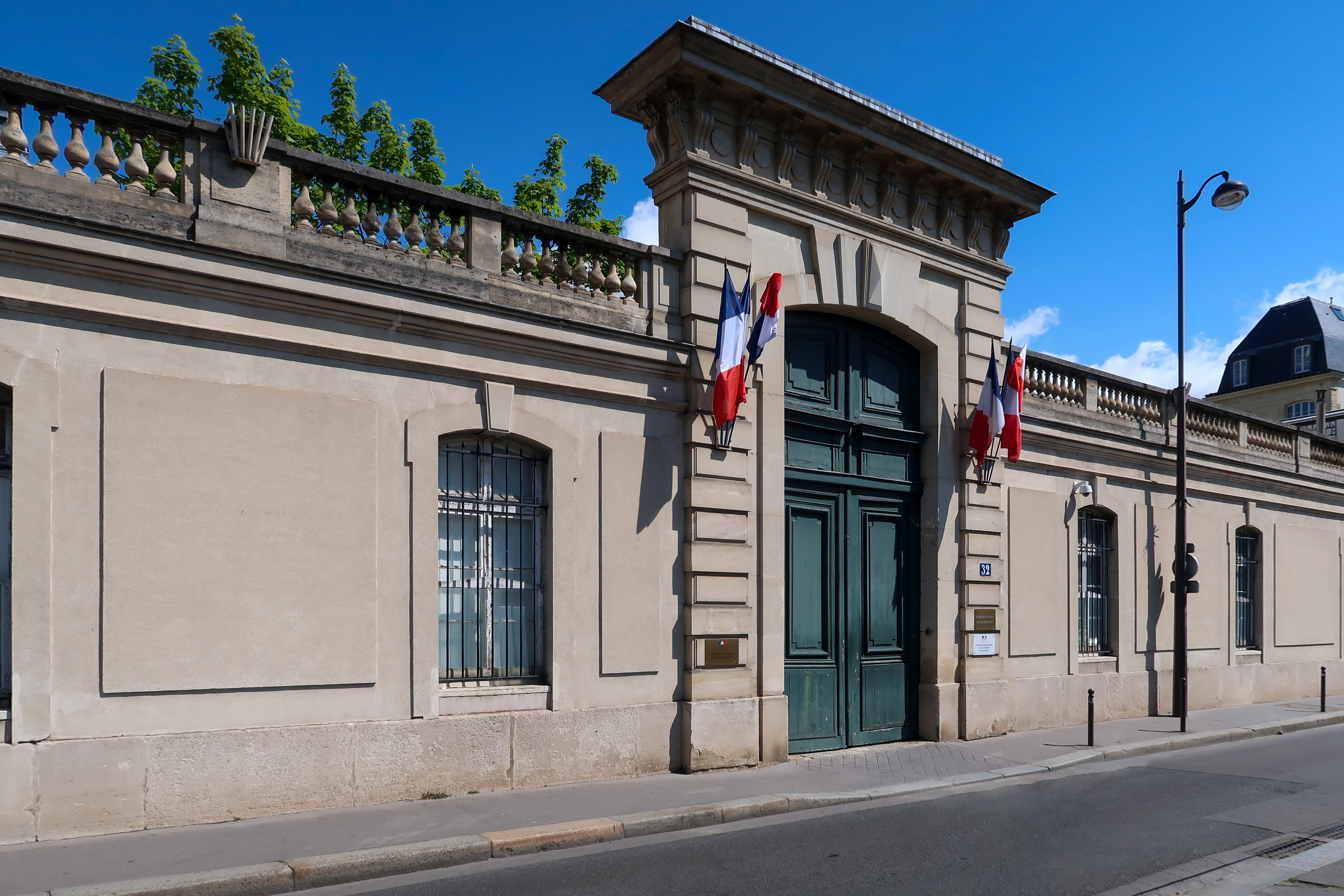
The Hôtel de Cassini houses government departments of the Prime Minister, including the State Secretariat for State Reform and Simplification, the Directorate General for Administration and the Civil Service, and the General Secretariat for Investment.

Sites previously occupied by government ministries:

- The hôtel de la Marine, housed the ministries and then the state secretariats in charge of the Navy, between 1789 and 1958.
- The Ministry of Finance moved into the Richelieu wing of the Louvre Palace in 1871 and remained there until 1988.
- Pentemont Abbey housed the administration of the Ministry of War and then the Ministry of Defence between 1915 and 2015. The site was then sold by the State.
- The Hôtel de Broglie-Haussonville was sold and now belongs to the National Assembly.
- The Hôtel de Seignelay was sold by the State in 2019.

== Popular culture ==
=== Literature ===
- Le Solliciteur, ou l'Art d'obtenir des places, comédie en 1 acte mêlée de vaudevilles (Eugène Scribe, Dupin, Varner, Ymbert, Delestre-Poirson), Paris, Théâtre des Variétés, 1817
- Les Gens de bureau (1877) by Émile Gaboriau.
- Messieurs les ronds-de-cuir (1893) by Georges Courteline.
- Monsieur Badin, Scène de la vie de bureau (1897) by Georges Courteline.
- Vercoquin et le Plancton (1946) by Boris Vian.

=== Cinema ===
- L'Exercice du pouvoir (1978) de Philippe Galland

== Bibliography ==
- Comité de réflexion et de proposition sur la modernisation et le rééquilibrage des institutions de la République, présidé par Édouard Balladur (January 2008). Une Ve République plus démocratique. Paris: Fayard et la Documentation française, hor. p. 267. ISBN 978-2-213-63620-7. OCLC 494562844. Comité Balladur 2008..
- Conseil d'État, section des finances (18 July 2007). Avis No. 380693 concernant l'impact des nouveaux périmètres ministériels sur l'organisation du dialogue social. Conseil d'État 2007..
- Conseil d'État (2014). Rapport public 2014 (PDF). Études et documents du Conseil d'État. Paris: la Documentation française. p. 394. ISBN 978-2-11-009764-4. OCLC 882268088..
- Dutheillet de Lamothe, Louis; Labrune, Nicolas; Firoud, Marc (December 2020). L'essentiel de la jurisprudence du droit de la fonction publique (PDF). Paris: DGAFP et Conseil d'État. p. 277. ISBN 978-2-11-162583-9..
- Granger, Marc-Antoine (April 2013). "Les décrets portant attributions des membres du Gouvernement". Revue française de droit constitutionnel (94): 335-355. doi:10.3917/rfdc.094.0335..
- Pierre, Eugène (1924). Traité de droit politique, électoral et parlementaire. Paris: Librairies-imprimeries réunies. pp. 1439–1. OCLC 492849597..
- Quillien, Philippe-Jean (January 2019) [October 2014]. 50 questions incontournables de culture administrative - incontournables de culture administrative. les mémentos. Paris: Ellipses. p. 139. ISBN 978-2-340-02924-8. OCLC 1083780832..
- Romieu, Jean (2 March 2022). "Conclusions sur". Revue générale du droit. Romieu_1892..
- "Qu'est-ce qu'un ministère ?". Vie publique. 18 July 2022. VP..

== See also ==
- Politics of France
