= Ministry of War (France) =

Government of France department, 1791 to 1947

- Ministère de la guerre

Ministry overview
- Formed: 25 May 1791
- Preceding Ministry: Secretary of State for War
- Dissolved: 31 October 1947
- Superseding Ministry: Ministry of the Armed Forces
- Minister responsible: Minister of War
- Child agencies: French Army; French Air Force; National Gendarmerie

The Ministry of War (French: Ministère de la guerre) was the Government of France department responsible for the French Army, the National Gendarmerie and until 1934, the French Air Force. It existed from 25 May 1791 to 31 October 1947, date to which it was merged with the Ministry of the Navy and the Ministry of Air into the Ministry of Armed Forces (then Ministry of National Defence). It was headed by the Minister of War, occasionally taking various titles.

== History ==
The Ministry of War was the heir of the royal Department for War existing during the Ancien régime. On 27 April 1791, the National Constituent Assembly issued a decree organizing the six ministries of Justice, Interior, Finances, War, Navy and Foreign Affairs. The decree was signed into law on 25 May 1791 by King Louis XVI.

The Committee of Public Safety suspended all six ministries in April 1794 and implemented instead twelve Executive Commissions; this act dismembered the department into numerous commissions. The ministry was reinstated with the formation of the Directory in November 1795.

In 1817, the State acquired the Hôtel de Brienne, at 14 rue Saint-Dominique (7th arrondissement) to serve as the Ministry of War.

In 1915, during the First World War, an Under Secretariat of State of the Military Aeronautics was created. It would eventually become independent in 1928 as the Ministry of Air.

The ministry remained in place in all subsequent governments, with some temporary name changes, until its final merger with the Ministry of the Navy and the Ministry of Air into the Ministry of Defence on 31 October 1947.

== Organisation ==
=== Napoleonic Wars ===
During the Napoleonic Wars, the minister was organised as follows:

Ministry of War Headquarters, at the Ministry of War Building in Paris, France

- Minister of War
- Ministry of War Administration
  - Intendant General of the Army (Jean François Aimé Dejean, 1802–1810; Jean-Gérard Lacuée, Comte de Cessac 1810–13; and Pierre Antoine Noël Bruno 1813–14 & 1815)
    - Director General for Supplies (Augustin Louis Petiet, 1804–06; Jacques-Pierre Orillard de Villemanzy, 1806; Pierre Antoine Noël Bruno, 1806–12; Guillaume-Mathieu Dumas, 1812–14; Jean-Pierre-Paulin-Hector Daure, 1815)
    - Chief Organizing Commissioners
      - Gendarmerie Department
      - Hospitals Department
      - Transport Department
      - Supplies & Rations Department
      - Support Department
- Director General of Reviews of Conscription (Jean-Gérard Lacuée, Comte de Cessac, 1806–10;, Guillaume-Mathieu Dumas, 1810–12; and Étienne d'Hastrel de Rivedoux, 1812–14)
- 6 x Inspectors in Chief of Reviews (Divisional Generals)
- 30 x Inspectors of Reviews (Brigade Generals)
- 100 x Sub-Inspectors of Reviews (Colonels)
- Assistant Sub-Inspectors, 1st Class (Chefs de Bataillons) – posts created in 1811
- Assistant Sub-Inspectors, 2nd Class (Captains)
- War Commissaires
