= Paul Thellier =

French politician (1899–1944)

Minister of Agriculture
- In office 24 January 1936 – 4 June 1936
- Prime Minister: Albert Sarraut
- Preceded by: Pierre Cathala
- Succeeded by: Georges Monnet

Minister of Agriculture
- In office 21 March 1940 – 16 June 1940
- Prime Minister: Paul Reynaud
- Preceded by: Henri Queuille
- Succeeded by: Albert Chichery

Personal details
- Born: 29 October 1899 Tangry, Pas-de-Calais, France
- Died: 29 August 1944 (aged 44) Roubaix, Nord, France

Paul Thellier (29 October 1899 – 29 August 1944) was a French politician who was Minister of Agriculture for a few months in 1936 and again in 1940.

== Life ==
Paul Thellier was born on 29 October 1899 in Tangry, Pas-de-Calais. He became a lawyer in 1921 joined the Bar of Lille. He ran for election to the legislature in 1932 for the 8th district of Lille, but was defeated by the Socialist candidate. He ran successfully in a by-election on 28 January 1934 in the district of Saint-Pol, and was reelected in the 1936 general elections. He sat with the Independent Republican group. He spoke several times in favor of interventionist agricultural policies.

On 24 January 1936 Thellier was appointed Minister of Agriculture in the cabinet of Albert Sarraut, and defended protectionist policies. He left office on 4 June 1936 when the Popular Front government came to power. During World War II (1939-45) he was appointed Minister of Agriculture in the cabinet of Paul Reynaud. On 10 July 1940 he voted for the constitutional change that gave full powers to Marshal Philippe Pétain. During the German occupation of France he worked as an advocate.

On 28 August 1944 Thellier was arrested in Lille by agents of the "brigade des anges", a network created by the German army to learn about the composition of the allied armies. He was wounded in the chest while trying to escape. His doctor was taking him to the hospital when they were intercepted in Roubaix and the doctor was forced out of the car. Theillier's corpse was found the next day in a burned car near Templeuve by the Belgian police. On 10 October 1944 the Military Court of Lille sentenced three of the men responsible for his murder to death and the fourth to forced labor for life.

== Sources ==
- Collectif (2005). "Thelier (Paul)". Dictionnaire des parlementaires français de 1940 à 1958 (in French). Paris: La Documentation française. ISBN 2-11-005990-7.
- Jolly, Jean (1960–1977). "Thelier (Paul)". Dictionnaire des parlementaires français; notices biographiques sur les ministres, députés et sénateurs français de 1889 à 1940 (in French). Paris: Presses universitaires de France. ISBN 2-1100-1998-0.
