= École nationale d'ingénieurs des techniques des industries agro-alimentaires =

Public educational and research institution in Nantes

Coordinates: 47°15′50″N 1°33′50″W

The École nationale d'ingénieurs des techniques des industries agro-alimentaires (ENITIAA) is a public institution of higher education and research located in Nantes.

== Structure ==
ENITIAA is a national graduate institute created in 1974 and affiliated with the French Ministry of Agriculture. There are about 500 students, 50 teachers and 80 administrative staff and technicians.

Students may enter ENITIAA after two or three years of university-level studies. The course lasts three years. Fields of instruction are the food industry, agribusiness, biotechnology, the chemical industry, the environment, the cosmetic and pharmaceutical industries, business services and logistics

Three recommended courses of study are:

- Design and optimization of foodstuffs
- Food-processing engineering and production management
- Quality, safety and environmental management

The school has several research laboratories and a workshop with production tools from the agribusiness sector.
