= Hôtel de Villeroy =

Hôtel de Villeroy may refer to:

- Hôtel de Villeroy (Paris, 1st arrondissement)
- Hôtel de Villeroy (Paris, 7th arrondissement)
