= Léon Mougeot =

French politician

Léon Paul Gabriel Mougeot
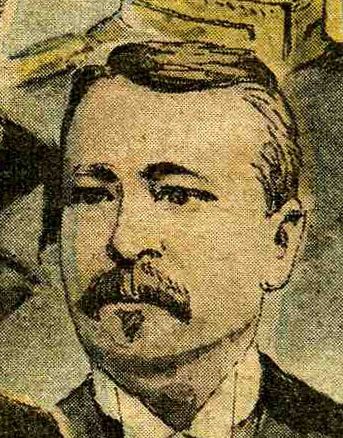
- Mougeot in 1902

Minister of Agriculture
- In office 7 June 1902 – 24 January 1905
- Preceded by: Jean Dupuy
- Succeeded by: Joseph Ruau

Personal details
- Born: 10 November 1857 Montigny-le-Roy, Haute-Marne, France
- Died: 25 October 1928 (aged 70) Rochevilliers, Haute-Marne, France

Léon Paul Gabriel Mougeot (10 November 1857 – 25 October 1928) was a French politician who was under-secretary of state for Posts and Telegraphs from 1898 to 1902, and Minister of Agriculture from 1902 to 1905. He was responsible for introducing cast-iron "mougeottes", letter boxes that displayed the day and last pick-up made, and for subsidizing the use of bicycles by postmen.

== Early career ==
Léon Paul Gabriel Mougeot was born on 10 November 1857 in Montigny-le-Roy, Haute-Marne, son of a notary. He attended the lycées of Chaumont and Nancy for his secondary education, then studied law in Dijon and Paris. At the age of 24 he became an attorney in Langres. He gained attention in 1892 for successfully defending a notary accused of abuse of confidence. In 1893 he was the founding president of the Horticulture and Wine growing Society of Haute-Marne. He and Édouard Dessein (1875–1961) co-founded several agricultural mutual funds. Mougeot was an active Freemason and belonged to the Chaumont lodge L'Étoile de la Haute-Marne.

Mougeot was elected to the Langres municipal council in 1884, and was mayor from 1888 to 1898. In 1898 he became a member of the general council of the department of Haute-Marne, and was president of the departmental assembly from 1907 to 1920. He was one of the leaders of the Radical Party in Haute-Marne and dominated local politics, particularly during the phylloxera crisis, when he defended the winemakers and distillers. He ran for election as a deputy in 1889 but was defeated. In 1893 Mougeot was elected deputy for Haute-Marne. At first he sat with the Progressive Left, of which he was secretary, then moved further left. He was secretary of the chamber from 1896 to 1898.

== Posts and telephones ==
Mougeot was under-secretary of state for Posts and Telegraphs from 5 July 1898 to 7 June 1902 in the cabinets of Henri Brisson, Charles Dupuy and Pierre Waldeck-Rousseau. On 18 May 1899 there was a strike of postmen in Paris due to the Senate having refused to agree with a decision by the deputies to pay Parisian postmen higher rates than their rural colleagues. Rather than agree to a general pay increase, the Senators refused any pay increase at all. Mougeot arranged to requisition several hundred soldiers and national guards to distribute the mail in Paris, which caused the strike to be cancelled immediately.

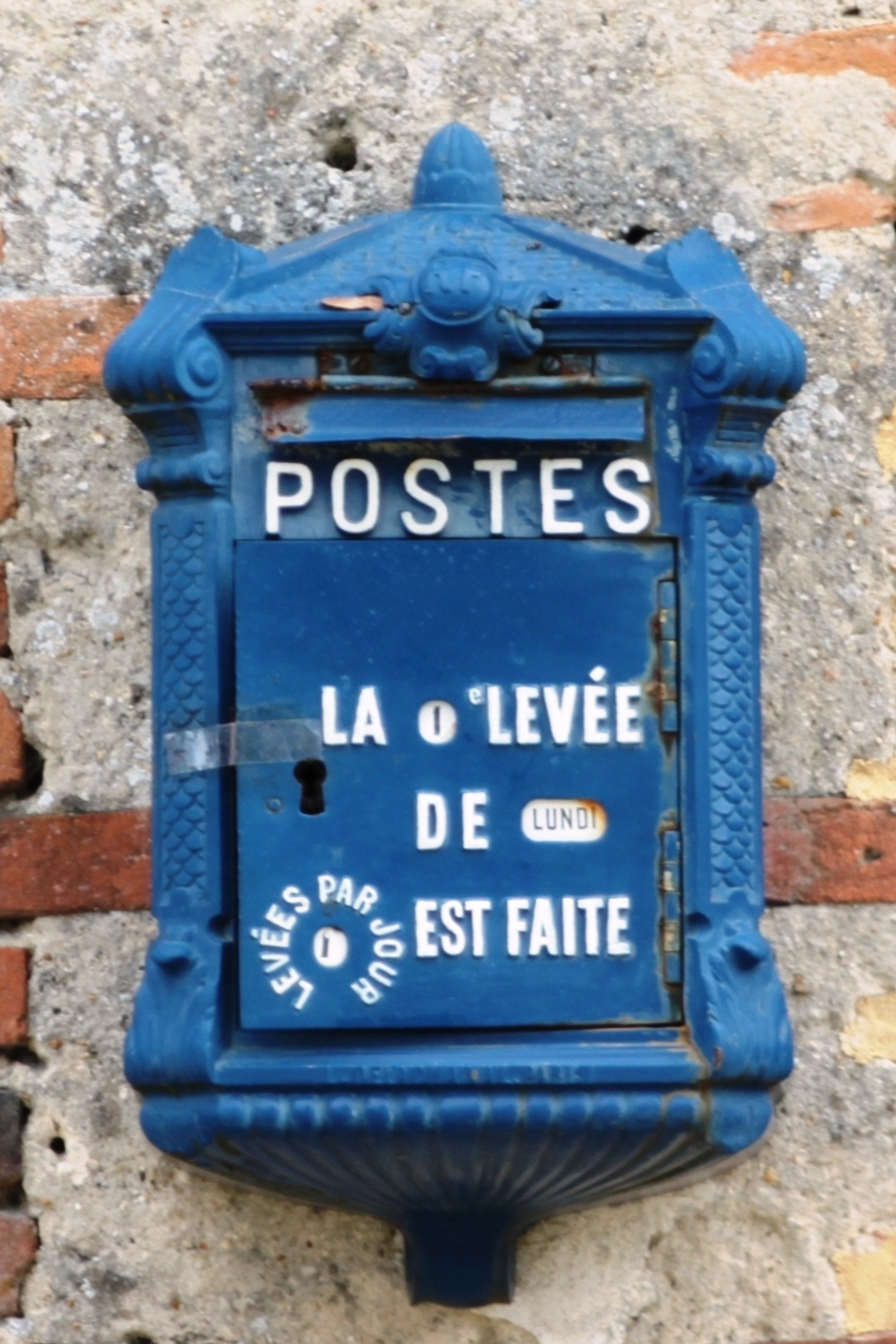
Mougeotte. The first pick-up of Monday has been made. One pick-up per day.

When Mougeot took office most letter boxes were of wood reinforced with iron, and dated to 1830. On 31 July 1899 Mougeot signed a decree to place a new type of cast-iron letter box into general usage, made by Delachanal of Paris. Nicknamed "mougeottes", they had three small windows that let the users see the day, the planned number of pick-ups and the last pick-up that had been made. Two variants were made, one wall-mounted and the other on an iron column fixed to the sidewalk. The "mougeottes" were introduced experimentally at first, but proved very popular and were soon installed throughout France. At first bronze-green in color, from 1905 they were painted blue.

In October 1899 Mougeot experimented in the 12th arrondissement of Paris with couriers using automobiles, but this did not catch on. Mougeot installed the first stamp machines, and postcards delivered by compressed air in Paris. He also supported the use of bicycles by postmen, a long-planned but always delayed innovation. Mougeot gave postmen a monthly allowance of 15 francs if their route was more than 32 kilometres (20 mi), and the same allowance to town postmen whose routes were more than 24 kilometres (15 mi). In 1898 he decided to build a "telephone office" in Langres, which came into service on 27 March 1900.

== Later career ==
Mougeot was Minister of Agriculture in the cabinet of Émile Combes from 7 June 1902 to 24 January 1905, and was firmly protectionist. He did not make any notable improvements. He did contribute to the protectionist law on adulteration of wine of 1905, which survived until 1993. Although adulterated alcohol could be dangerous to health, Mougeot said the law was solely to prevent fraud, since this was the only concern of the Ministry of Agriculture. In March–November 1907 Mougeot was political director of Le Petit Troyen, a regional journal. In August 1908 Mougeot was elected to the Senate and resigned his parliamentary seat. He sat with the Democratic Left in the Senate.

Mougeot acquired valuable landholdings in the colonies, and in Tunisia was called "le seigneur Mougeot". In 1913 he was chairman of the Compagnie Occidentale de Madagascar, (Note: The Compagnie Occidentale de Madagascar was founded as the Compagnie coloniale et des mines d'or de Superbieville et de la côte ouest de Madagascar on 4 May 1895. It was given large concessions so it could more effectively exploit the colony.) which he had violently opposed when he was a new deputy. He did not run for re-election in 1920. Léon Mougeot died on 25 October 1928 in Rochevilliers, Haute-Marne, at the age of 70.

== Publications ==
- Mougeot, Léon (1880), Des Conventions qui modifient la composition de la communauté..., Imp. F. Pichon, p. 110
- Mougeot, Léon-Paul-Gabriel (1902-12-04), Projet de loi forestière relative à l'Algérie, adopté par la Chambre des députés, Paris: P. Mouillot, p. 70
- Dumont, Charles; Mougeot, Léon (1906-06-26). Proposition de loi sur l'administration de l'armée (services de l'intendance et de santé) (in French). Paris: Motteroz. p. 80.

== Sources ==
- Debré, Jean-Louis (2008-06-04), Les oubliés de la République (in French), Fayard, ISBN 978-2-213-64558-2
- Éditions Chronique (2013-05-17), Chronique du timbre-poste français (in French), Éditions Chronique, ISBN 978-2-36602-035-9
- Jacob, Guy; Kœrner, Francis (October–December 1972), "Economie de traite et bluff colonial : la Compagnie occidentale de Madagascar (1895-1934)", Revue Historique (in French), 248 (2), Presses Universitaires de France: 333–366, JSTOR 40951911
- Jolly, Jean (1960–1977). "Mougeot (Léon, Paul, Gabriel)". Dictionnaire des parlementaires français; notices biographiques sur les ministres, députés et sénateurs français de 1889 à 1940 (in French). Paris: Presses universitaires de France. ISBN 2-1100-1998-0.
- Le Petit Troyen (in French), BnF
- Mayeur, Jean-Marie; Rebirioux, Madeleine; Foster, J. R. (1987), The Third Republic from Its Origins to the Great War, 1871-1914, Cambridge University Press, ISBN 978-0-521-35857-6
- Stanziani, Alessandro (2012-02-13), Rules of Exchange: French Capitalism in Comparative Perspective, Eighteenth to Early Twentieth Centuries, Cambridge University Press, ISBN 978-1-107-00386-6
