= Albert Chichery =

French politician (1888–1944)

Albert Marc Chichery
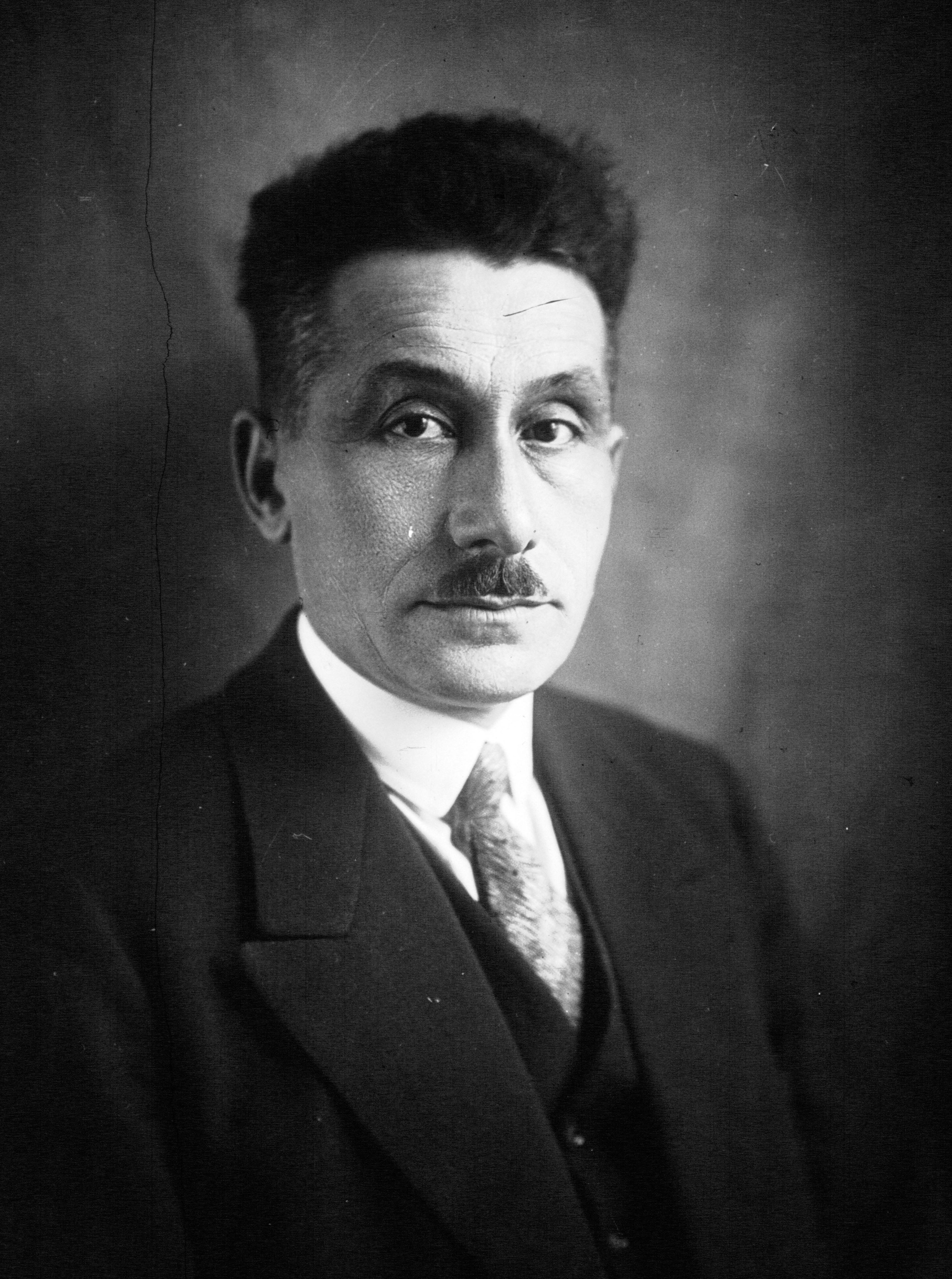
- Chichery in 1932

Minister of Commerce and Industry
- In office 5 June 1940 – 16 June 1940
- Prime Minister: Paul Reynaud
- Preceded by: Léon Baréty
- Succeeded by: Yves Bouthillier

Minister of Agriculture and Food Supply
- In office 16 June 1940 – 12 July 1940
- Prime Minister: Philippe Pétain
- Preceded by: Paul Thellier, Henri Queuille
- Succeeded by: Pierre Caziot

Personal details
- Born: 12 October 1888 Le Blanc, Indre, France
- Died: 15 August 1944 (aged 55) Le Blanc, Indre, France

Albert Marc Chichery (12 October 1888 – 15 August 1944) was a French politician who was briefly Minister of Commerce and Industry, then Minister of Agriculture and Food Supply, in June–July 1940.

== Early years ==
Albert Marc Chichery was born on 12 October 1888 in Le Blanc, Indre. He completed his secondary education at the Collège du Blanc, then began working for his parents' business. They ran a butcher's shop in Le Blanc. He was called up for military service, which he completed as an officer of the reserve. In World War I (1914–18) he served with the 135th infantry regiment. He rose to the rank of Lieutenant. After the war he founded a factory that made bicycles, with considerable success. Production rose to 25,000 annually in a factory with 150 employees. His business owned the "Dion-Bouton" brand. His "Dilecta" brand bicycles won all the major road races.

== Political career ==
Chichery was elected to the municipal council, then to the general council of the Indre department. He was elected to the legislature on the second ballot in the general elections of 1–8 May 1932 for Le Blanc constituency. He sat with the Radical Republican and Radical Socialist group. He was reelected on the second ballot in May 1936. He became president of the Radical group in the chamber. He stated, "from the ideological point of view, Radical doctrine best embodies the Cartesian spirit of our country. ... In the words of President Herriot, Radicalism is the political applications of rationalism, that particularly French quality." Chichery was not a strong Radical leader, and mainly served as the instrument of Édouard Daladier for managing the deputies.

At the time of the Munich crisis, at the urging of Colonel André Laffargue, Chichery pressed Daladier to appoint Maxime Weygand head of the armed forces. During World War II (1939–45), when the Reynaud–Daladier cabinet was formed on 22 March 1940, Chichery told Reynaud, "The only thing left for you to do is resign." On 5 June 1940 Chichery was named Minister of Commerce and Industry in the cabinet of Paul Reynaud in place of Léon Baréty, who had resigned on 18 May 1940. The Reynaud cabinet was dissolved on 16 June 1940, and Chichery was appointed Minister of Agriculture and Food Supply in the cabinet of Philippe Pétain, holding office until 12 July 1940. He succeeded Henri Queuille as Minister of Supplies and Paul Thellier as Minister of Agriculture. He was succeeded by Paul Caziot.

On 10 July 1940, Chuchery voted in favour of granting the cabinet presided by Marchal Philippe Pétain authority to draw up a new constitution, thereby effectively ending the French Third Republic and establishing Vichy France. In 1941, he was made a member of the National Council of Vichy France. During the liberation of France Chichery was abducted from his property near Le Blanc on 15 August 1944 and killed in the nearby woods by a bullet through the neck.

== Sources ==
- "Albert Chichery. De Dilecta à "l'affaire"". Abe Books. (in French).
- Bankwitz, Philip Charles Farwell (1967-01-01). Maxime Weygand and Civil-military Relations in Modern France. Harvard University Press. p. 262. ISBN 978-0-674-55701-7.
- Blatt, Joel (1997-08-15). The French Defeat of 1940: Reassessments. Berghahn Books. ISBN 978-0-85745-717-2.
- Boussard, Isabel (April 1984). "Principaux Aspects de la Politique Agricole Française Pendant la Deuxième Guerre Mondiale". Source: Revue d'histoire de la Deuxième Guerre mondiale et des conflits contemporains, 34e Année (in French). 34 (134). Presses Universitaires de France: 1–32. JSTOR 25729180.
- Collectif (1994-09-26). Dictionnaire des parlementaires français de 1940 à 1958 (in French). Vol. 3. C-D. Paris: La Documentation française. ISBN 978-2110029836.
- Deniau, Jean-François (1998-01-01). Le bureau des secrets perdus (in French). Odile Jacob. ISBN 978-2-7381-0494-6.
- Froment, Pascale (2001-11-02). René Bousquet. Fayard. ISBN 978-2-213-66424-8.
- Jolly, Jean (1960–1977). "Chichery (Albert, Marc)". Dictionnaire des parlementaires français; notices biographiques sur les ministres, députés et sénateurs français de 1889 à 1940 (in French). Paris: Presses universitaires de France. ISBN 2-1100-1998-0.
- Larmour, Peter J. (1964). The French Radical Party in the 1930s. Stanford University Press. ISBN 978-0-8047-0206-5.
