= Fernand David =

French politician (1869–1935)

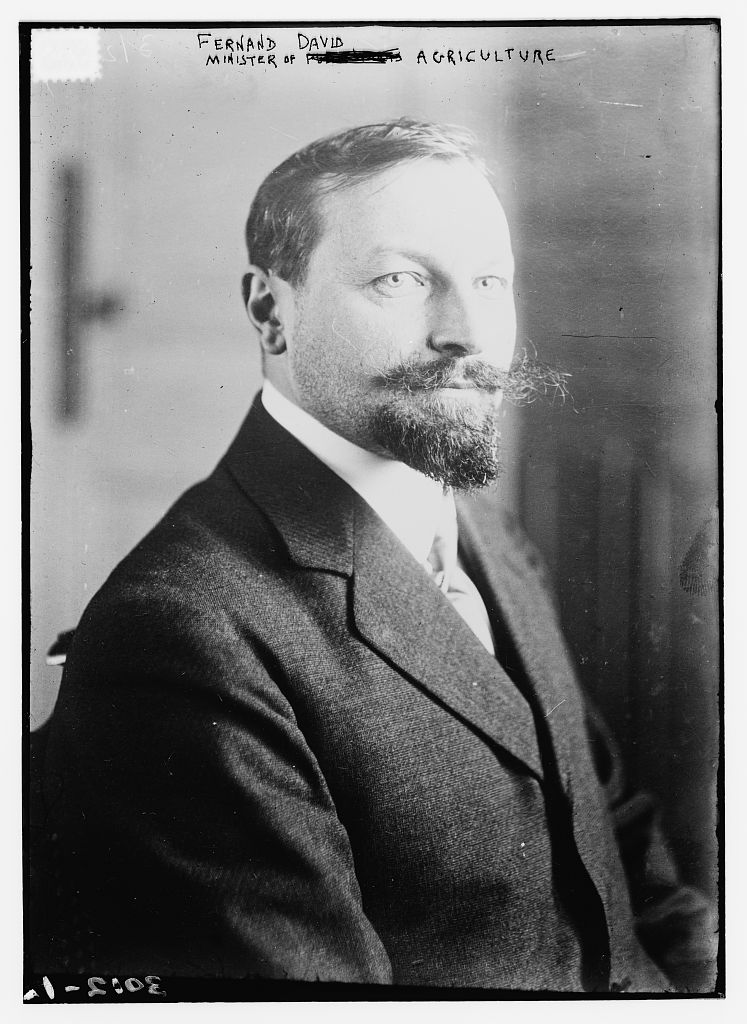
David circa 1913–1914

Fernand David (18 October 1869, Annemasse, Haute-Savoie – 17 January 1935) was a French lawyer and politician who served as a minister on six occasions. Especially interested in agricultural questions, he served as Minister of Agriculture under seven governments.

He served as Minister of Commerce and Industry from 14 January 1912 to 20 January 1913, Minister of Agriculture from 21 January to 21 March 1913, from 13 June 1914 to 29 October 1915, from 20 March to 15 November 1917, and from 2 March to 12 December 1930. He also served as Minister of Public Works from 9 December 1913 to 8 June 1914.
