= Joseph Ruau =

French lawyer and radical politician

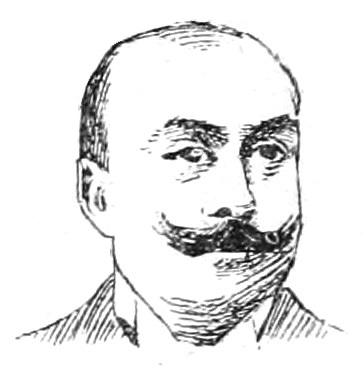
- Ruau from Le Monde moderne, December 1898

Minister of Agriculture
- In office 24 February 1905 – 2 November 1910
- Preceded by: Léon Mougeot
- Succeeded by: Maurice Raynaud

Personal details
- Born: 5 June 1865 Paris, France
- Died: 29 September 1923 (aged 58) Ivry-sur-Seine, Seine, France
- Occupation: Lawyer

Joseph Ruau (5 June 1865 – 29 September 1923) was a French lawyer and radical politician. He was deputy for Haute-Garonne from 1897 to 1914, and was Minister of Agriculture from 24 February 1905 to 2 November 1910. He was known for promoting agricultural cooperatives

== Life ==
=== Early career ===
Joseph Ruau was born in Paris on 5 June 1865. He was grandson of the mathematician Joseph Liouville and son of a director-general of the Mint. He obtained a doctorate in Law and joined the Toulouse bar as an attorney. He was elected municipal councilor and mayor of Aspet, Haute-Garonne, then general councilor for Aspet in the departmental assembly.

Ruau was elected to the legislature as deputy for Haute-Garonne in a byelection on 30 May 1897, and sat with the Radical Democrats. He was reelected in 1898, 1902, 1906 and for the last time in 1910. He was secretary of the Chamber twice, in 1898 and 1899, and rapporteur for the agriculture budget several times. As vice-president of the radical left he supported the governments of Pierre Waldeck-Rousseau and Émile Combes.

=== Minister of Agriculture ===
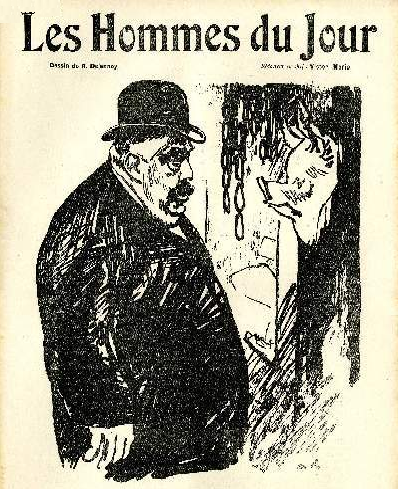
1910 caricature by Aristide Delannoy

Ruau was appointed Minister of Agriculture on 24 February 1905 in the cabinet of Maurice Rouvier and retained this office in the cabinets of Ferdinand Sarrien, Georges Clemenceau and Aristide Briand until 2 November 1910. In 1906 he presented a law that organized long-term financing of agricultural cooperatives by the Crédit agricole banks. The cooperatives were defined as societies of people rather than of capital based on the principle of "one man, one vote" in which profits were shared. The state offered guarantees to the banks. Ruau issued a decree to regulate the organization and operation of horse racing. He proposed measures to assist farm laborers who had suffered work accidents and southern wine growers ruined by the fall in the price of wine that followed the losses due to phylloxera.

On 5 July 1908 Ruau spoke at the second national conference on mutual credit and agricultural cooperation at Blois. He pointed out that the state was promoting a rural, property-owning democracy. This was true, but he gave an exaggerated view of the benefits of recent legislation in promoting agricultural syndicates and mutual aid societies. He overstated the influence of his government in promoting rural cooperation, which had been developing for over a century but still had far to go. He supported the creation in 1910 of a radical federation of capitalist farmers of the Parisian Basin in competition to the very conservative Union Centrale des Syndicats des Agriculteurs de France.

=== Last years ===
Ruau suffered a physical and mental collapse due to the strain of office, and was placed in a nursing home in Ivry-sur-Seine in late 1910. He died there on 29 September 1923 at the age of 58.

== Publications ==
- Ruau, Joseph (1908), La politique agricole de la République : discours prononcé à Blois, le 5 juillet 1908, par M. J. Ruau, ministre de l'Agriculture, à l'occasion du deuxième Congrès national du crédit mutuel et de la coopération agricoles (in French), Paris: Revue de la solidarité sociale, p. 30

== Sources ==
- Baker, Alan R. H. (2004-03-18), Fraternity Among the French Peasantry: Sociability and Voluntary Associations in the Loire Valley, 1815–1914, Cambridge University Press, ISBN 978-0-521-60271-6
- Jolly, Jean (1960–1977). "Ruau (Joseph)". Dictionnaire des parlementaires français; notices biographiques sur les ministres, députés et sénateurs français de 1889 à 1940 (in French). Paris: Presses universitaires de France. ISBN 2-1100-1998-0.
- Joseph Ruau (in French), Ministry of Agriculture (France)
- Lebot, Médard; Pesche, Denis (1998), Campagnes en mouvement: un siècle d'organisations paysannes en France, ECLM, ISBN 978-2-84377-039-5
- Rebirioux, Madeleine (1988-01-29), "A radical Republic? 1898–1914", The Third Republic from Its Origins to the Great War, 1871–1914, J. R. Foster, translator, Cambridge University Press, ISBN 978-0-521-35857-6
