= Athanase Louis Marie de Loménie, comte de Brienne =

The Most High and Potent Lord Louis-Marie-Athanase de Loménie Comte de Brienne
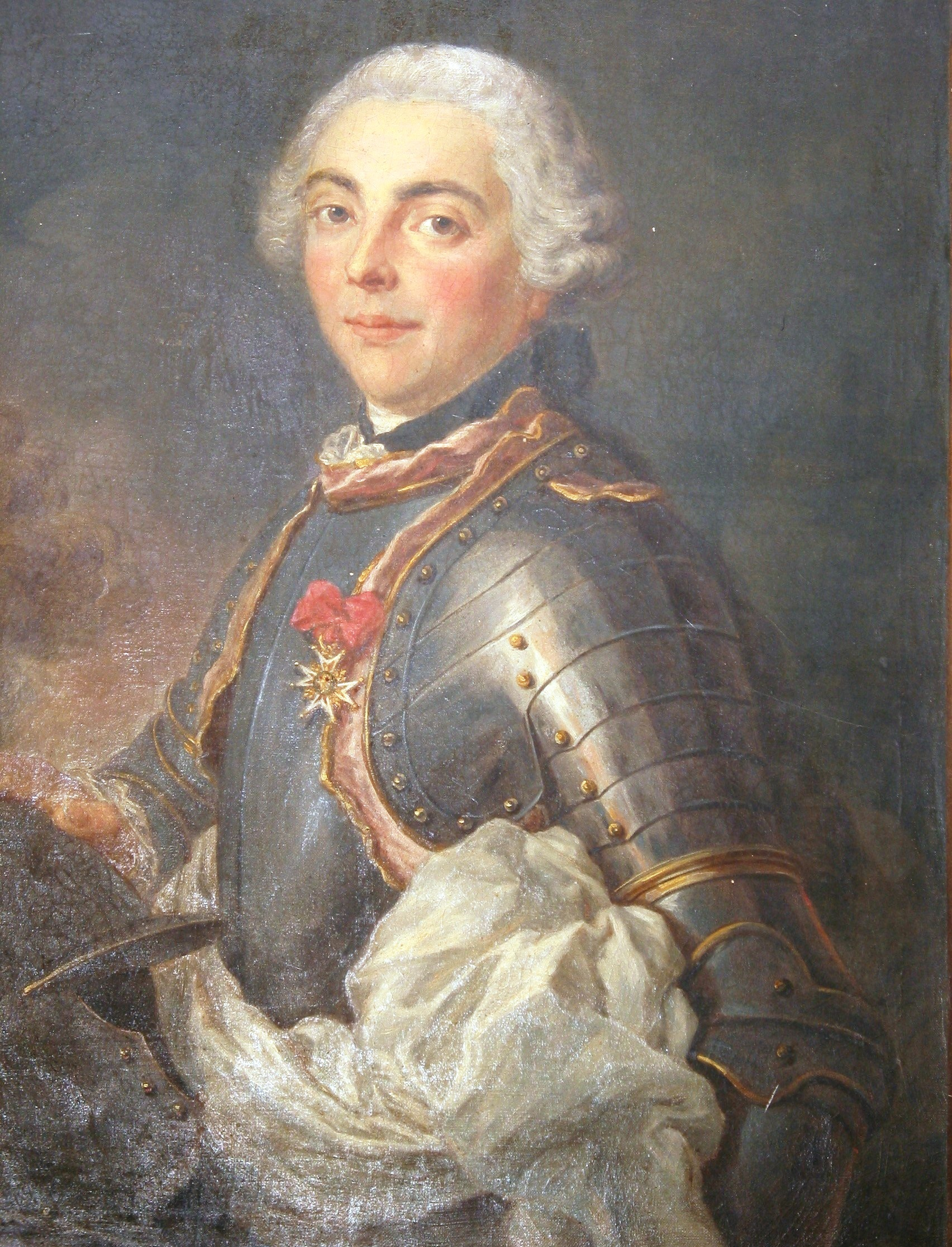

Secretary of State for War
- In office 23 September 1787 – 21 August 1788
- Preceded by: Louis Charles Auguste Le Tonnelier, Baron de Breteuil, Baron de Preuilly
- Succeeded by: Louis Pierre de Chastenet, Comte de Puységur

Personal details
- Born: 20 April 1730 Flavignac, Limousin, Kingdom of France
- Died: 10 May 1794 (aged 64) Paris, Seine-et-Marne, French Republic

Military service
- Branch/service: France Army: Royal Artois Infantry Regiment
- Years of service: 1747–1788
- Rank: Lieutenant Général des Armées du Roi

Louis-Marie-Athanase de Loménie, Comte de Brienne (20 April 1730 – 10 May 1794) was a French officer and politician, who was guillotined during the French Revolution.

== Life ==
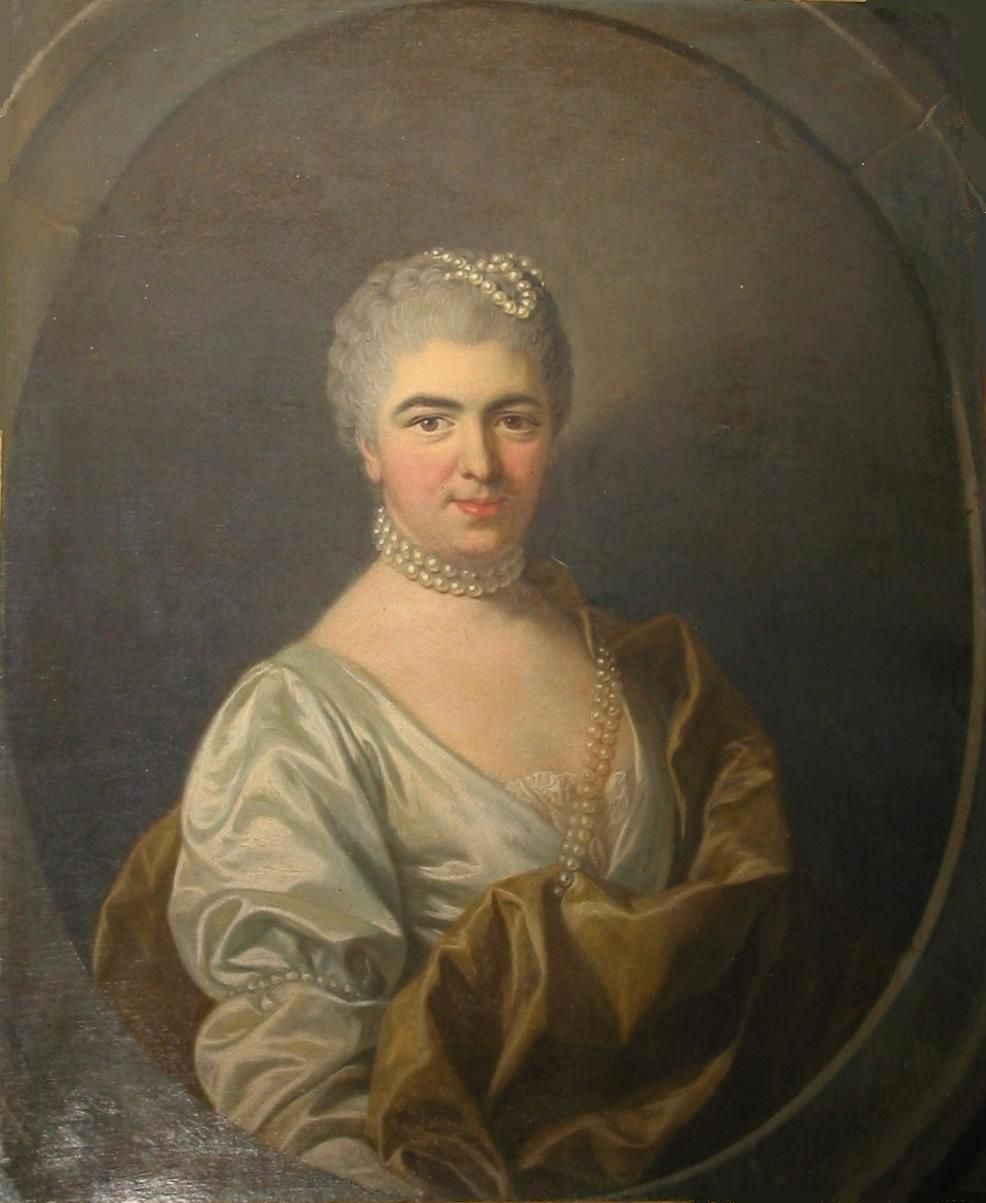
Mme Loménie de Brienne, née Fizeaux by Charles-André van Loo

He was from the younger branch of the Lomenie Flavignac family originating in Limousin, which became in the seventeenth century the house of Brienne. Louis-Marie-Athanasius was the younger brother of Cardinal Etienne-Charles de Lomenie de Brienne, Minister of Louis XVI. As Lieutenant General of the French Royal Army, he commanded the Royal regiment of Artois from 1747 to 1762. Appointed Secretary of State for War from 1787 to 1788, he was guillotined on 21 Floreal Year II (10 May 1794) with four other members of his family and Élisabeth de France.

He was Marquis de Moy and lord of Vendeuil by marrying Etiennette Fizeau Clémont, who was the daughter of a wealthy mill owner in Saint-Quentin. He rebuilt the castle in Brienne-le-Château, and bought in Paris a beautiful town house in the Rue Saint-Dominique called Hôtel de Brienne, current residence of the Minister of the Army.

Athanase de Brienne and Etiennette Fizeaux had a son, François-Alexandre-Antoine Lomenie, Vicomte de Brienne, commanding officer of the 12th regiment of chasseur à cheval, who was guillotined on 21 Floréal Year II at the age of 36 years. His widow, Madame de Montbreton, died in 1851; Brienne-le-Château was then sold to the Princesse de Bauffremont.

Figure	Blazon
	Quarterly: 1st and 4th Or, 2 cows Gules; 2nd and 3rd Argent, to the lion crowned Gules, the forked tail, tied and passed in saltire; overall, gold to. The tree vert, placed on a cake of sand; a chief azure, charged with three lozenges Argent.

== See also ==
- House of Brienne

== Sources ==
- BNF, département des Manuscrits, div. occidentale, fonds Bauffremont Fr 23350–23621.
- Brienne (Comte de ) et Loménie de Brienne (Etienne-Charles de), Journal de l'Assemblée des Notables de 1787, éd. P. Chevallier, 1960.
- Mme de Créquy, Souvenirs.
- Stanford Library, 18th Century Judicial.
- Bunel Arnaud, Héraldique Européenne, 1997–2007.
- ville-brienne-le-chateau.fr
- archives of the Fizeaux family (private foundation).

Political offices
Preceded by Louis Auguste Le Tonnelier de Breteuil	Secretary of State for War; 23 September 1787 – 30 November 1788	Succeeded by Louis Pierre de Chastenet de Puységur
