= Roger Houdet =

French politician and engineer

Roger Houdet (14 June 1899 – 25 August 1987) was a French engineer and politician.

From 1966 to 1969 he was a Representative of the Parliamentary Assembly of the Council of Europe for France. From 1952 to 1959 he was a Senator for Seine-Maritime in the Fourth Republic. The highest position he held was Minister of Agriculture, which he held in numerous governments from 1953 to 1955 and from 1958 to 1959.
