= List of senators of Seine-Maritime =

Location of Seine-Maritime in France

Following is a list of senators of Seine-Maritime, people who have represented the department of Seine-Maritime in the Senate of France. The department was known as "Seine-Inférieure" until 1955, when it was given the present more positive-sounding name.

== Third Republic ==
Senators for Seine-Inférieure under the French Third Republic were:

- Gustave Rouland (1876–1878)
- Jules Ancel (1876–1891)
- Pierre Robert (1876–1891)
- Augustin Pouyer-Quertier (1876–1891)
- Pierre Lizot (1882–1891)
- Lucien Dautresme (1891–1892)
- Paul Casimir-Perier (1891–1897)
- Pierre Le Souef (1891–1900)
- Richard Waddington (1891–1913)
- Hippolyte Rouland (1892–1898)
- Jules Siegfried (1897–1900)
- Édouard Fortier (1898–1915)
- Jules Gervais (1900–1909)
- Louis de Montfort (1900–1911)
- Auguste Rispal (1903–1909)
- Raoul Ancel (1909–1911)
- Julien Goujon (1909–1912)
- Louis Quesnel (1912–1927)
- Julien Rouland (1912–1927)
- Louis Brindeau (1912–1936)
- Auguste Leblond (1913–1920)
- Georges Bouctot (1920–1927)
- Robert (Pomereu) (1920–1936)
- Paul Bignon (1927–1932)
- André Lavoinne (1927–1940)
- Gaston Veyssière (1927–1940)
- Robert Thoumyre (1932–1940)
- René Coty (1936–1940)
- Jean Thureau-Dangin (1936–1940)

== Fourth Republic ==
Senators for Seine-Inférieure or Seine-Maritime under the French Fourth Republic were:

- Célestin Dubois (1946–1948)
- Germaine Pican (1946–1948)
- Guy Montier (1946–1948)
- Henri Paumelle (1946–1959)
- Geoffroy (Montalembert) (1946–1959)
- Marcel Léger (1948–1952)
- René Coty (1948–1953)
- Roger Houdet (1952–1959)
- Marcel Lebreton (1954–1959)

== Fifth Republic ==
Senators for Seine-Maritime under the French Fifth Republic:

| In office | Name | Group or party | Notes |
|---|---|---|---|
| 1959–1965 | Henri Paumelle | Groupe de la Gauche Démocratique | Died in office 17 December 1965 |
| 1959–1968 | Marcel Lebreton | Groupe des Républicains et Indépendants | |
| 1959–1973 | Jean Lecanuet | Groupe Union Centriste | Resigned 11 March 1973 (elected deputy) |
| 1959–1977 | Roger Houdet | Groupe des Républicains et Indépendants | |
| 1959–1993 | Geoffroy de Montalembert | Groupe du Rassemblement pour la République | Died in office 2 March 1993 |
| 1965–1968 | Roger Thiébault | Groupe socialiste | Replaced Henri Paumelle 18 December 1965 |
| 1968–1969 | Léon Rogé | Groupe Communiste | Died in office 12 September 1969 |
| 1968–1986 | Charles Ferrant | Groupe Union Centriste | |
| 1969–1986 | Jacques Eberhard | Groupe Communiste | Replaced Léon Rogé on 13 September 1969 |
| 1973–1977 | Paul Caron | Groupe Union Centriste | Replaced Jean Lecanuet on 2 April 1973 |
| 1977–1995 | André Bettencourt | Groupe des Républicains et Indépendants | |
| 1977–1986 | Jean Lecanuet | Groupe Union Centriste | Resigned 2 April 1986 (elected deputy) |
| 1977–1995 | Tony Larue | Groupe socialiste | Died in office 5 July 1995 |
| 1986–1988 | André Duroméa | Groupe Communiste | Resigned 13 July 1988 (elected deputy) |
| 1986–1995 | Paul Caron | Groupe Union Centriste | Replaced Jean Lecanuet on 2 April 1986 |
| 1986–1993 | Jean Lecanuet | Groupe Union Centriste | Died in office 22 February 1993 |
| 1988–1998 | Robert Pagès | Groupe communiste républicain citoyen et écologiste | Replaced André Duroméa 14 July 1988; Resigned 2 October 1998 |
| 1993–1995 | Roger Fossé | Groupe du Rassemblement pour la République | Replaced Jean Lecanuet on 23 February 1993 |
| 1993 | André Martin | Groupe du Rassemblement Démocratique et Européen | Replaced Geoffroy de Montalembert 3 March 1993; Died in office 7 November 1993 |
| 1994–1995 | François Gautier | Groupe Union Centriste | Elected 6 February 1994 (by-election) |
| 1995–2004 | Annick Bocandé | Groupe des Républicains et Indépendants | |
| 1995–2004 | Henri Weber | Groupe socialiste | |
| 1995–2013 | Marc Massion | Groupe socialiste et apparentés | Replaced Tony Larue 6 July 1995; Resigned 31 December 2013 |
| 1995-2014 | Patrice Gélard | Groupe Union pour un Mouvement Populaire | |
| 1995–2019 | Charles Revet | Groupe Les Républicains | Resigned 30 September 2019 |
| 1998–present | Thierry Foucaud | Groupe communiste républicain citoyen et écologiste | Replaced Robert Pagès on 3 October 1998 |
| 2004–2007 | Sandrine Hurel | Groupe socialiste | Resigned 28 June 2007 (elected deputy) |
| 2007–2013 | Alain Le Vern | Groupe socialiste et apparentés | Replaced Sandrine Hurel on 29 June 2007; Resigned 30 September 2013 |
| 2013-2014 | Marie-Françoise Gaouyer | Groupe socialiste et apparentés | Replaced Alain Le Vern 1 October 2013 |
| 2014–present | Didier Marie | Groupe socialiste et républicain | Replaced Marc Massion 1 January 2014 |
| 2004–present | Catherine Morin-Desailly | Groupe Union Centriste | |
| 2014–present | Agnès Canayer | Groupe Les Républicains | |
| 2014–present | Nelly Tocqueville | Groupe socialiste et républicain | |

== Sources ==
- Liste des anciens sénateurs de la IIIème République par circonscription (in French), Sénat de France
- Liste des anciens sénateurs de la IVème République par circonscription (in French), Sénat de France
- Liste des anciens sénateurs de la Vème République par circonscription (in French), Sénat de France
- Liste par département – Seine-Maritime (in French), Sénat de France
