= Louis Pierre de Chastenet de Puységur =

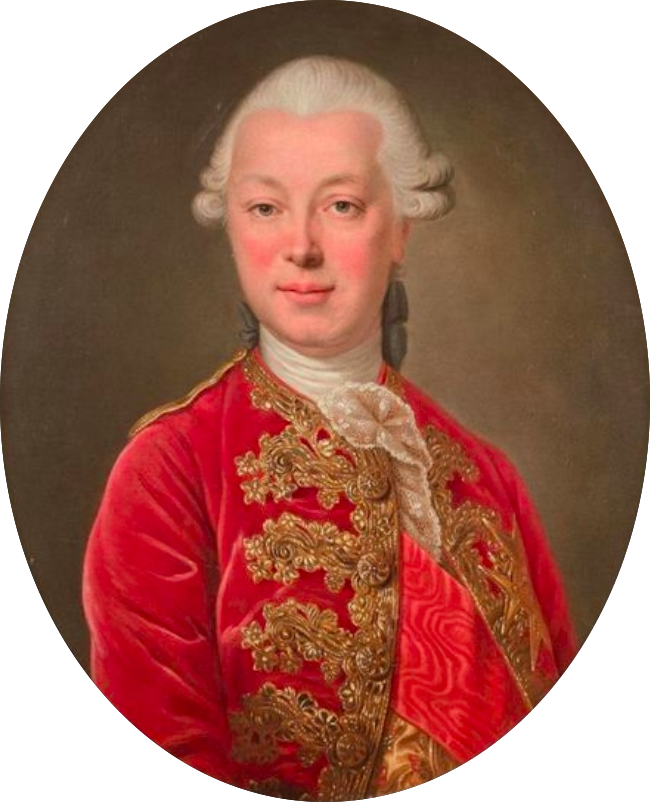

Louis Pierre de Chastenet, comte de Puységur (30 December 1727, Rabastens, Tarn – October 1807, Rabastens) was a French soldier under the Ancien Régime.

== Biography ==
He was the eldest son of Pierre Hercule de Chastenet and Jacquette Pages. Bishop Jean Auguste de Chastenet de Puységur was his brother.

A lieutenant général from 1781, he became minister of war in the ministry of Jacques Necker, from 30 November 1788 to 12 July 1789. Replaced by Victor-François, 2nd duc de Broglie, he received marks of esteem from the Assembly. Remaining faithful to the king, he commanded a small troop of gentlemen and defended the Tuileries against the Revolutionaries on 10 August 1792, and emigrated soon afterwards.
He returned on Napoleon's seizure of power on 18 Brumaire and institution of the First French Empire, and died in his home town.

Political offices
| Preceded by Athanase Louis Marie de Loménie, comte de Brienne | Secretary of State for War; 1788–1789 | Succeeded by Victor-François, 2nd duc de Broglie |
