= Georges Monnet =

French politician (1898–1980)

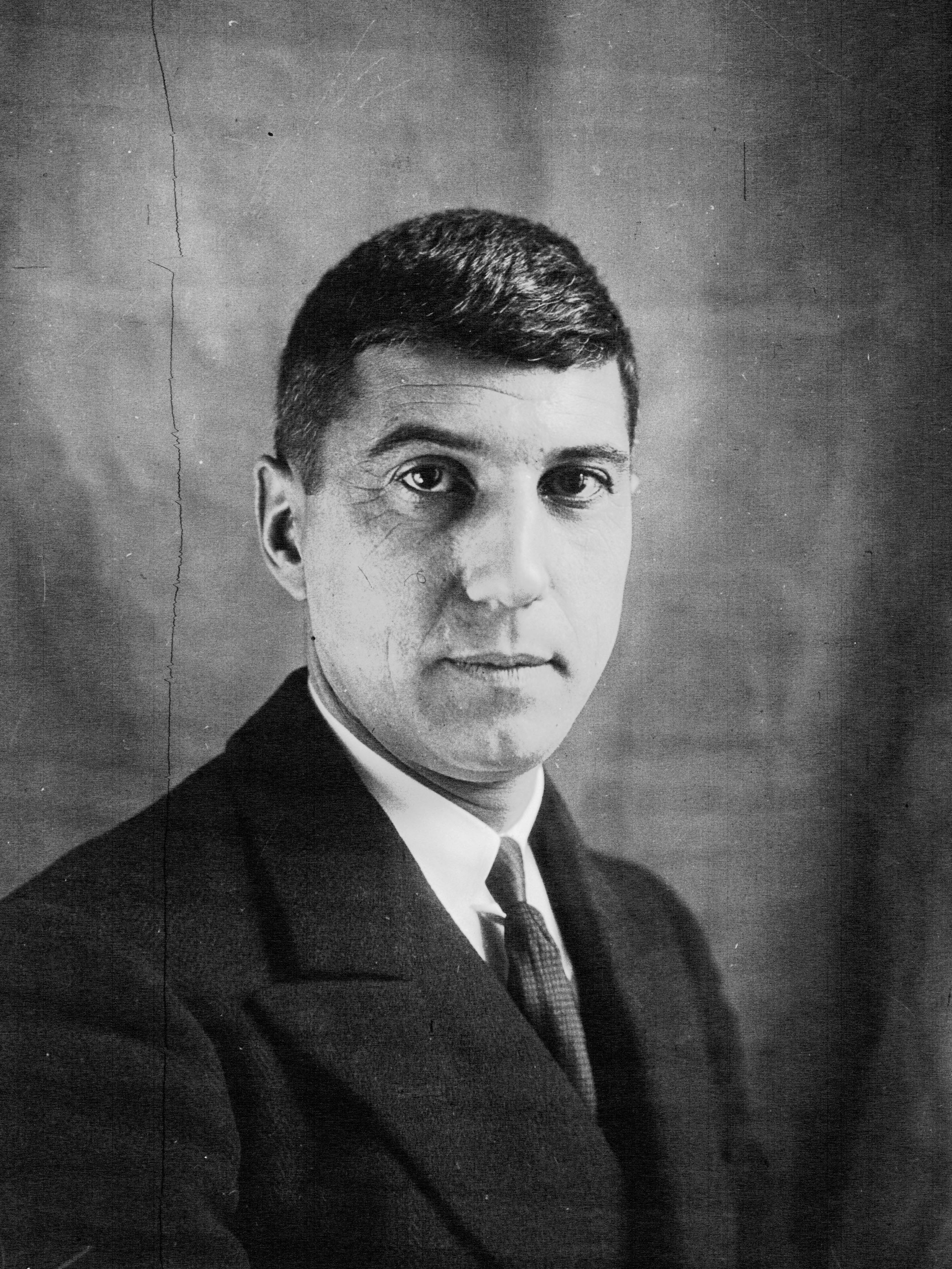
- Monnet in 1932

Minister of Agriculture
- In office 1936–1938
- Prime Minister: Léon Blum; Camille Chautemps
- Preceded by: Paul Thellier
- Succeeded by: Henri Queuille

Minister of Blockade
- In office 1939–1940

Personal details
- Born: 12 August 1898 Aurillac, France
- Died: 9 December 1980 (aged 82) Val-de-Marne, France
- Party: Socialist

Military service
- Allegiance: France
- Branch/service: French Army
- Years of service: 1917–1918

Georges Monnet (12 August 1898, Aurillac, Cantal – 9 December 1980) was a prominent socialist politician in 1930s France and a member of Paul Reynaud's war cabinet as Minister of Blockade. Preceding that, he was Minister of Agriculture in Léon Blum's government. He was decorated for his service in the First World War, receiving the Croix de Guerre.

== Inter war ==
After fighting in the First World War, Monnet became head of a large farm in Picardy before moving on to politics and joining the Socialist Party in 1928. Monnet was elected as a member of the French Chamber of Deputies in 1932 and again in 1936.

In 1933, he joined the administrative board and became the permanent expert of the SFIO for agricultural issues. He modernized the socialist doctrine by focusing it towards the goal of practical and immediate reforms to help small and medium-scale farms.

As Minister of Agriculture in the first Léon Blum government, he used his land policy to defend small farmers through the control of agricultural prices.

== Second World War ==
He opposed the Munich Agreement in 1938 and ran a newspaper about Action for peace and socialism, which proposed a firm line against Hitler, although it was largely ignored by other prominent pro-appeasement socialists, such as Georges Bonnet. In Paul Reynaud's cabinet, he became Minister of Blockade. Monnet indicated his disapproval of the French armistice after the fall of France in 1940; however, on 10 July 1940, during the vote to give Marshal Philippe Pétain full powers held at Vichy, he did not vote against it but abstained. During the Occupation, he refused to compromise with Vichy but also to actively engage in the Resistance.

Three French cabinet ministers, Édouard Daladier, Georges Monnet and Paul Reynaud c.1940

== Post war ==
After the war, Monnet went to Africa to continue to play a political role. He became Counselor of the French Union from 1947 to 1958. He was Minister of Agriculture under Félix Houphouët-Boigny from 1959 to 1961 and personal adviser to the President (Félix Houphouët-Boigny) of Ivory Coast shortly after its independence from France, serving from 1961 to 1964. A few years later, he returned to France and became president of the National Agricultural Exhibition and Competition (CENECA).

== Decorations ==
- Croix de Guerre 1914-1918
- Commander of the Legion of Honor
- Commander of Agricultural Merit
