= Government of France =

Government of the French Republic
- Gouvernement de la République française
- Central government

Overview
- Established: 4 October 1958 (Fifth Republic)
- State: French Republic
- Leader: Prime Minister of France
- Appointed by: President of France
- Main organ: Council of Ministers
- Responsible to: National Assembly
- Annual budget: €299.7 billion
- Headquarters: Hôtel Matignon, Paris
- Website: info.gouv.fr (in French)

Government of France (French: Gouvernement français, pronounced [ɡuvɛʁnəmɑ̃ fʁɑ̃sɛ]), officially the Government of the French Republic (Gouvernement de la République française, [ɡuvɛʁnəmɑ̃ d(ə) la ʁepyblik fʁɑ̃sɛːz]), or the Fifth Republic (Cinquième République), exercises executive power in France. It is composed of the prime minister, who is the head of government, as well as both senior and junior ministers.

The Council of Ministers, the main executive organ of the government, was established in the Constitution in 1958. Its members meet weekly at the Élysée Palace in Paris. The meetings are presided over by the president of France, the head of state, although the officeholder is not a member of the government.

The Prime Minister may designate ministers to be titled as ministers of state (ministres d'État), who are the most senior, followed in protocol order by ministers (ministres), ministers delegate (ministres délégués), whereas junior ministers are titled as secretaries of state (secrétaires d'État). All members of the government, who are appointed by the president following the recommendation of the prime minister, are responsible to the National Assembly, the lower house of the French Parliament. Cases of ministerial misconduct are tried before the Cour de Justice de la République.

With regard to Monaco, it is the Government of France's prerogative to propose to the Prince of Monaco an appointee to be Minister of State.

== Composition and formation ==
All members of the French government are appointed by the president of the Republic on the advice of the prime minister. Members of the government are ranked in a precise order, which is established at the time of government formation. In this hierarchy, the prime minister is the head of government. While the president is constitutionally free to appoint whomever they like, in practice, they must nominate a candidate that reflects the will of the majority of the National Assembly, as the government relies on the confidence of the French Parliament. After being nominated to lead a government, the prime minister nominee must propose a list of ministers to the president. The president can either accept or reject these proposed ministers. Ministers are ranked by importance:

- Ministers of state (French: ministres d'État) are senior ministers and are members of the Council of Ministers. It is an honorary rank, granted to some Ministers as a sign of prestige.
- Ministers (French: Ministres) are senior ministers and are members of the Council of Ministers. They lead government ministries.
- Secretaries of state (French: secrétaires d'État) are junior ministers. This is the lowest rank in the French ministerial hierarchy. Secretaries work directly under a minister, or sometimes directly under the prime minister. While the Council of Ministers does not include secretaries of state as members, secretaries may attend meetings of the Council if their portfolio is up for discussion.

== Functions ==
According to the Constitution of the French Fifth Republic, the government directs and decides the policy of the nation. In practice, the government writes bills to be introduced to parliament, and also writes and issues decrees. All political decisions made by the government must be registered in the government gazette.

=== Council of Ministers ===
The Council of Ministers (French: Conseil des ministres) is established by the Constitution. It is composed only of the senior ministers, though some secretaries of state may attend Council meetings. The Council of Ministers is chaired by the president, unlike the government, but is still led by the prime minister, who was officially titled as the president of the Council of Ministers (French: président du Conseil des ministres) during the Third and Fourth Republics.

All "projects of law" (projets de loi, bills that are proposed by the government, while propositions de loi are the ones proposed by members of Parliament) and some decrees must be approved by the Council of Ministers. Furthermore, it is the Council of Ministers that defines the collective political and policy direction of the government, and takes practical steps to implement that direction. In addition to writing and implementing policy, the government is responsible for national defence, and directs the actions of the French Armed Forces. The workings of the government of France are based on the principle of collegiality.

Meetings of the Council of Ministers take place every Wednesday morning at the Élysée Palace. They are presided over by the president of the Republic, who promotes solidarity and collegiality amongst government ministers. These meetings follow a set format. In the first part of a meeting, the Council deliberates over general interest bills, ordinances, and decrees. In the second part, the Council discusses individual decisions by each minister regarding the appointment of senior civil servants. In the third part, usually, either one minister will give a presentation about some reform or project that they are directing, or the president will ask for advice on some subject from the ministers. In addition, the minister of foreign affairs provides the Council with weekly updates on important international issues.

=== Ministries ===
Most government work, however, is done elsewhere. Much of it is done by each individual ministry, under the direction of the minister responsible for that ministry. Ministers each have their own staff, called a "ministerial cabinet" (French: Cabinet ministériel). Each ministerial cabinet consists of around ten to twenty members, who are political appointees. Cabinet members assist the minister in running a ministry. Members of ministerial cabinets are powerful figures within the government and work in both the political and administrative spheres. The hierarchy in each ministerial cabinet is determined by the minister. Working groups consisting of representatives from several ministries are commonplace. It is the duty of the prime minister to oversee these inter-ministry meetings and to ensure that government work is done effectively and efficiently. All ministerial cabinet decisions must be co-signed by the prime minister. Any decree must also seek the prime minister's advice as well.

=== Budget ===
The government is responsible for the economic and financial policy of the French Republic, the prime minister must authorize all expenditures made by each ministry, and also manage all revenue. Expenditures are made through what is called a "finance law" (French: Loi de Finances), which is equivalent to an appropriation bill. Each minister must prepare a list of requests for funds annually, and submit it to the Budget Ministry. This ministry decides whether to grant or deny requests for funding by ministers. The ministry also calculates the state budget for the coming year. The parliament must vote on all applications of finance law.

== Separation of powers ==
Members of the French government cannot occupy any parliamentary office or position of occupational or trade leadership at the national level, any public employment, or any professional activity. These restrictions are in place to alleviate external pressure and influence on ministers, and to enable them to focus on their governmental work. Thus, a member of the National Assembly or the Senate who is appointed to the government must resign their seat in order to serve as a minister or as the prime minister. Despite these restrictions, members of the government are allowed to keep local elected positions, such as those of city mayor or regional councilor. While the Constitution of the French Republic does not prohibit ministers from being the leader of a political party, it is customary that ministers should not occupy such a post.

The government is responsible to the French Parliament. In particular, the government must assume responsibility for its actions before the National Assembly, and the National Assembly can dismiss the government with a motion of censure. The government cannot function during the tenure of acting (interim) president, as that position is granted either to the president of the Senate or the prime minister, compromising separation of powers. If the government decides to launch an armed operation with a duration of longer than four months, it must first consult parliament and request an authorization. The prime minister may convene parliament for extraordinary sessions, or add additional sitting days to the legislative calendar.

== Current government ==
=== Ministries ===
The names of ministries change often in France. This is a list of current ministries:

- Ministry of the Interior
- Ministry of Justice
- Ministry for Europe and Foreign Affairs
- Ministry of Armed Forces and Veterans Affairs
- Ministry of Partnership with the Territories and Decentralization
- Ministry of Health and Access to Care
- Ministry of Solidarity, Autonomy and Equality between Women and Men
- Ministry of the Economy, Finance and Industry
- Ministry of Ecological Transition, Energy, Climate and Risk Prevention
- Ministry of Culture
- Ministry of Labour, Employment
- Ministry of Housing and Urban Renewal
- Ministry of National Education
- Ministry of Sports, Youth and Community Life
- Ministry of Agriculture, Food Sovereignty and Forestry
- Ministry of the Civil Service, Simplification and Transformation of Public Action
- Ministry of Higher Education, Research
