= Tangry =

- Commune
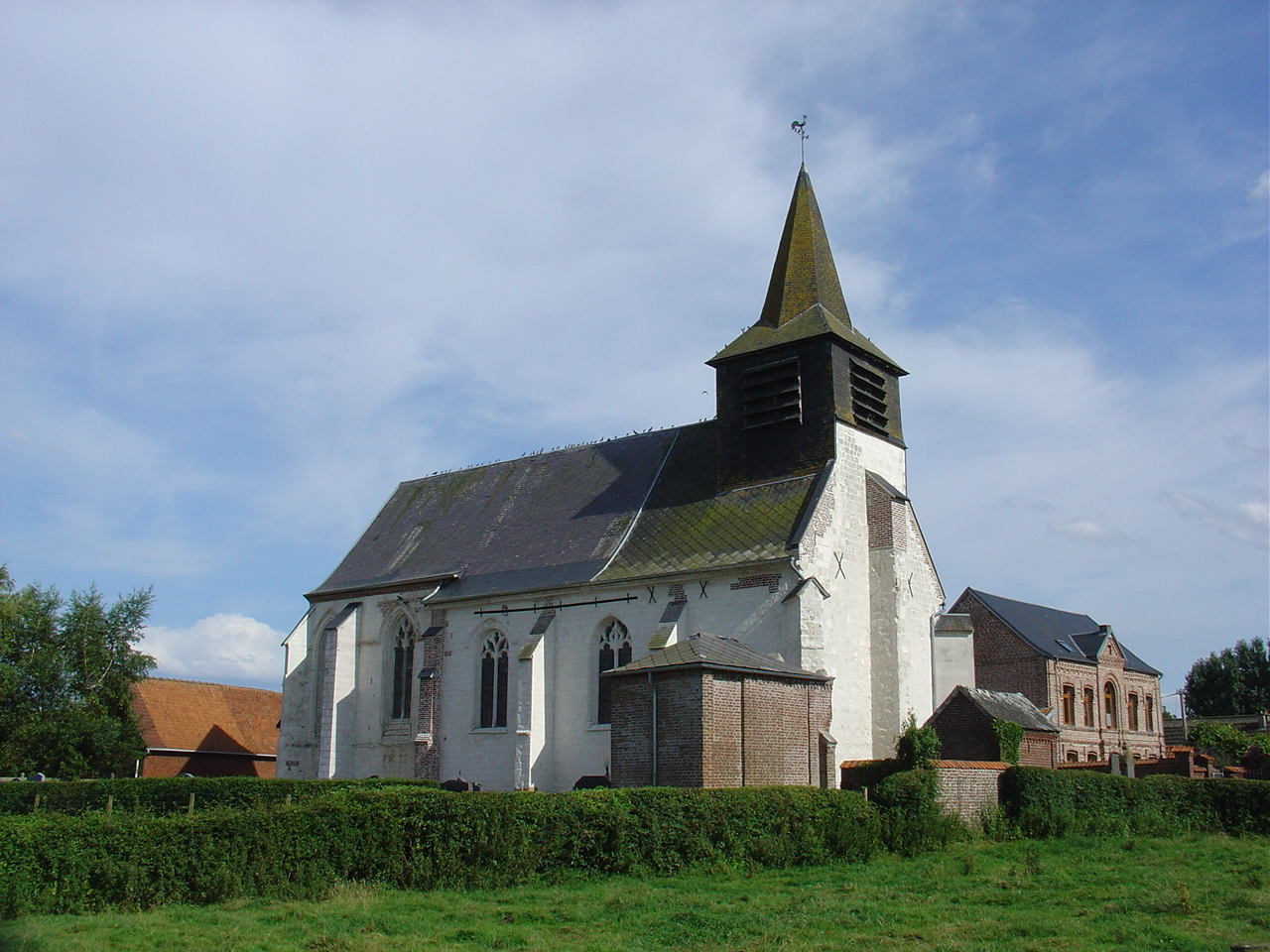
- The church of Tangry

- Coat of arms
- Location of Tangry
- Location within France Location within Hauts-de-France
- Coordinates: 50°27′57″N 2°21′18″E
- Country: France
- Region: Hauts-de-France
- Department: Pas-de-Calais
- Arrondissement: Arras
- Canton: Saint-Pol-sur-Ternoise
- Intercommunality: CC Ternois

Government
  - Mayor (2020–2026): Olivier Rigot
- Area^{1}: 4.84 km^{2} (1.87 sq mi)
- Elevation: 164 m (538 ft)
- Highest elevation: 168 m (551 ft)
- Lowest elevation: 128 m (420 ft)
- Population (2023): 265
  - Density: 54.8/km^{2} (142/sq mi)
- Time zone: UTC+01:00 (CET)
  - Summer (DST): UTC+02:00 (CEST)
- INSEE/Postal code: 62805 /62550
- ^{1} French Land Register data, which excludes lakes, ponds, glaciers > 1 km^{2} (0.386 sq mi or 247 acres) and river estuaries.

Tangry (French pronunciation: [tɑ̃ɡʁi]) is a commune in the Pas-de-Calais department in the Hauts-de-France region of France.

Tangry lies 36 km northwest of Arras, at the junction of the D70, D77 and D99 roads.

== Main sights ==
- The church of St.Omer, dating from the sixteenth century.

== See also ==
- Communes of the Pas-de-Calais department
