= Villiers-sur-Suize =

- Commune
- Coat of arms
- Location of Villiers-sur-Suize
- Location within France Location within Grand Est
- Coordinates: 47°58′52″N 5°11′53″E
- Country: France
- Region: Grand Est
- Department: Haute-Marne
- Arrondissement: Chaumont
- Canton: Châteauvillain

Government
  - Mayor (2020–2026): Roseline Gruot
- Area^{1}: 17.55 km^{2} (6.78 sq mi)
- Elevation: 345 m (1,132 ft)
- Population (2023): 255
  - Density: 14.5/km^{2} (37.6/sq mi)
- Time zone: UTC+01:00 (CET)
  - Summer (DST): UTC+02:00 (CEST)
- INSEE/Postal code: 52538 /52210
- ^{1} French Land Register data, which excludes lakes, ponds, glaciers > 1 km^{2} (0.386 sq mi or 247 acres) and river estuaries.

Villiers-sur-Suize (French pronunciation: [vilje syʁ sɥiz]) is a commune in the Haute-Marne department in north-eastern France.

== See also ==
- Communes of the Haute-Marne department
