= Hôtel de Villeroy (Paris, 7th arrondissement) =

Historic building on the Rue de Varenne, 7th arrondissement of Paris

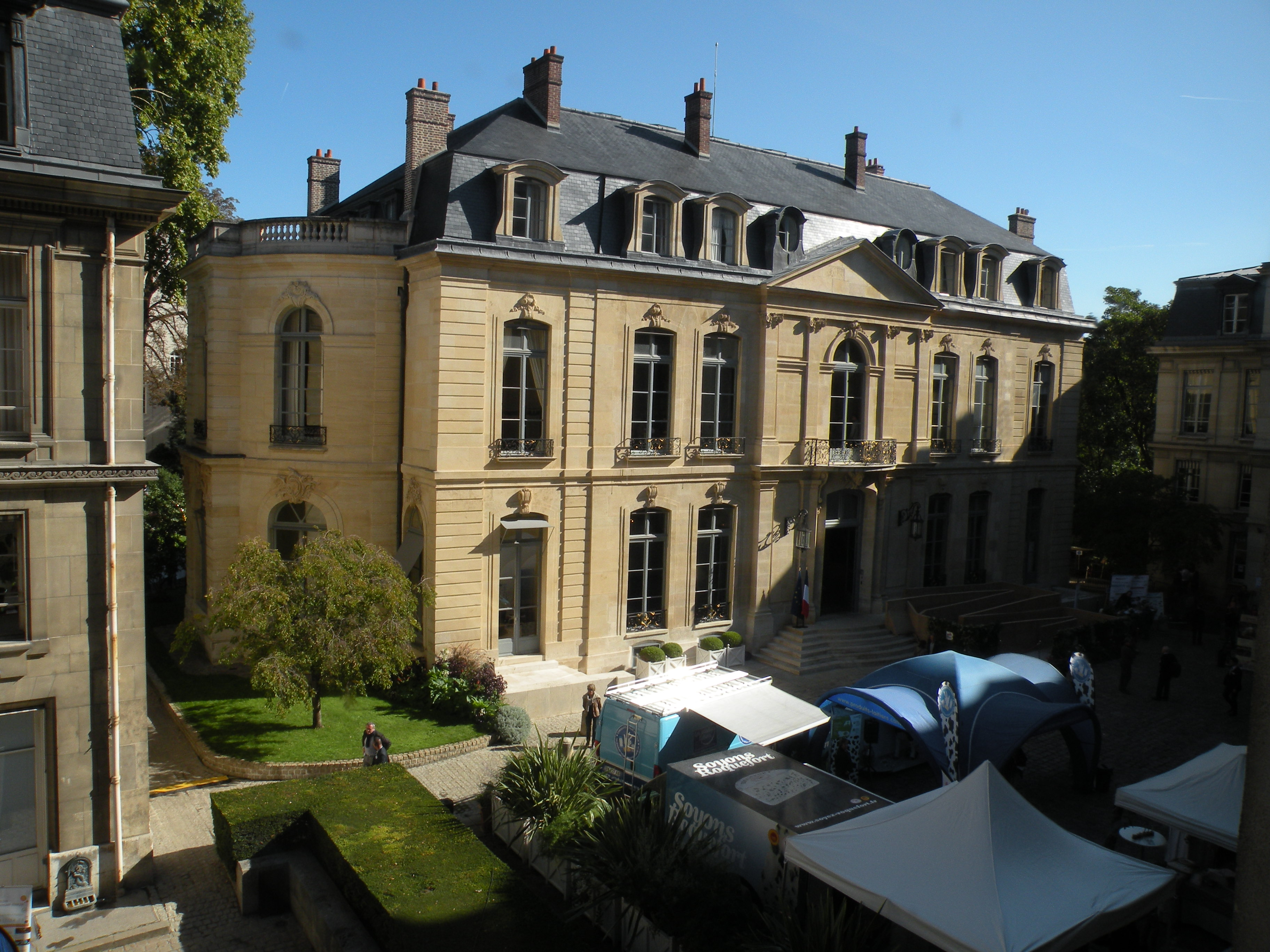
- Façade of the Hôtel de Villeroy
- Interactive map of the Hôtel de Villeroy area

General information
- Type: Hôtel particulier
- Location: Paris, France
- Coordinates: 48°51′20″N 2°19′05″E

The Hôtel de Villeroy is an 18th-century building in Paris, built on the initiative of Antoine Hogguer of Saint-Gall, Baron de Presles for his mistress, the actress Charlotte Desmares.

== History ==
It is located at no 78 rue de Varenne in the 7th arrondissement of Paris, not far from the Hôtel de Matignon, located on the same street. Since 1881, it has housed the French Ministry of Agriculture and Food.

Its current occupant is Annie Genevard, Minister of Agriculture, Agrifood, and Forestry since 21 September 2024.

== Bibliography ==
- Allermoz-Wallez (Sylvie), « L’hôtel de Villeroy », dans Le Faubourg Saint-Germain : rue de l'université, Paris, Délégation à l’Action artistique de la Ville de Paris, Société d’Histoire et d’Archéologie du 7^{e} arrondissement, 1987, pp. 29–31.
- Gabriel Mareschal de Bièvre, L’hôtel de Villeroy et le Ministère de l'Agriculture, Paris, Edouard Champion, 1924, 158 p.
