= Rue Saint-Dominique =

Street in Paris, France

Coordinates: 48°51′36″N 2°18′38″E

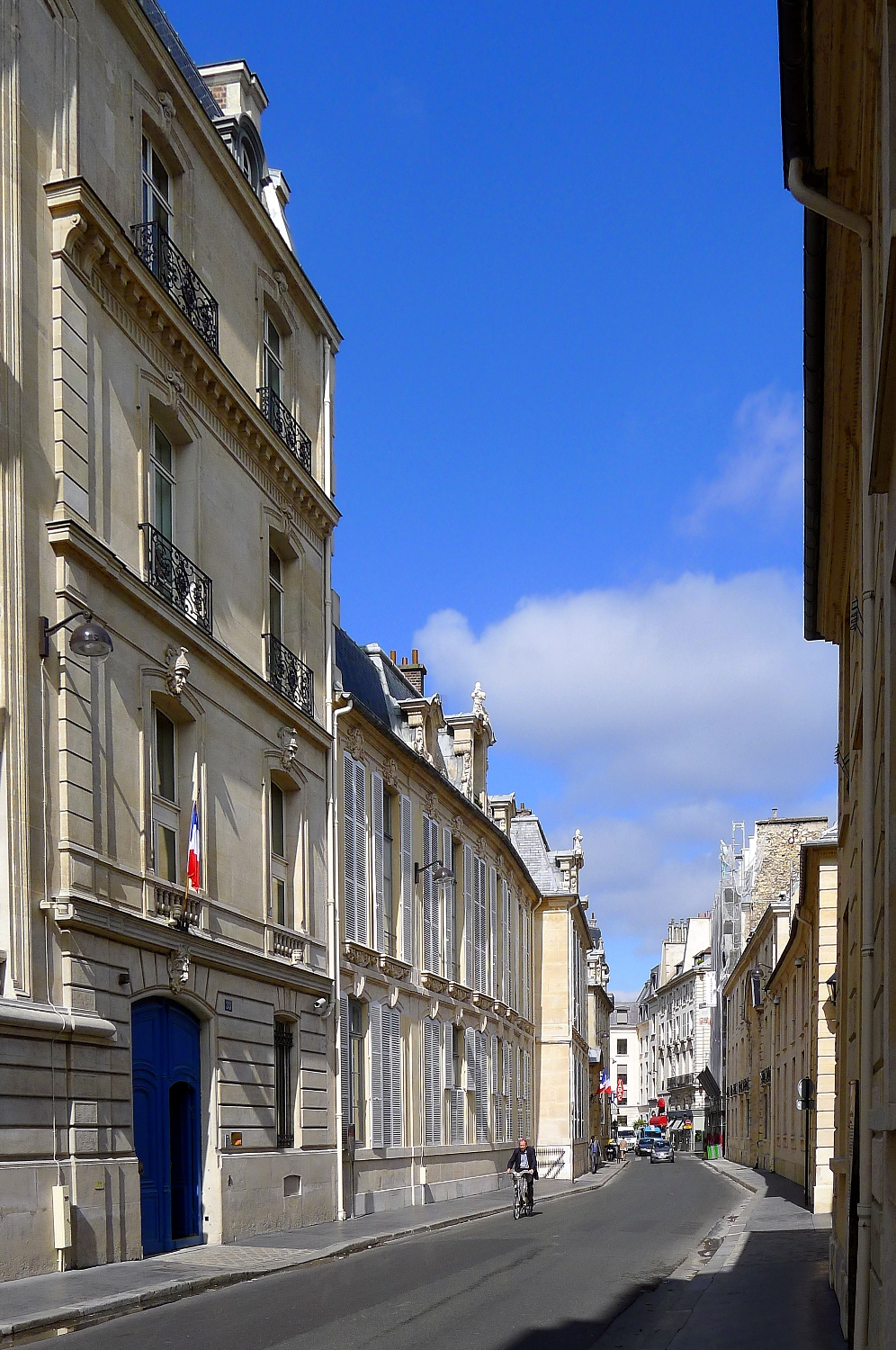
Rue Saint-Dominique

The Rue Saint-Dominique (French pronunciation: [ʁy sɛ̃dɔminik]; "St Dominique Street") is a street in the 7th arrondissement of Paris. It is crossed by the Esplanade des Invalides.

== Origin of the name ==
It was formerly known as the Chemin de la Longue Raye (1355), Chemin des Treilles (1433), Chemin Herbu (des Moulins à Vent) (1523), Chemin de l'Oseraie (1527), Chemin du Port (1530), Chemin des Vaches (1542), Chemin de la Justice and Chemin des Charbonniers. It was renamed the Rue Saint-Dominique in 1643 after the Dominican monastery set up a few years earlier near the eastern end of the street (now absorbed by the Boulevard Saint-Germain), whose only remnant is the Église Saint-Thomas-d'Aquin on the Place Saint-Thomas-d'Aquin (called the Place des Jacobins until 1802, after the Dominicans).

== Notable addresses ==
- In 1670, Jeanne Baptiste d'Albert de Luynes was born at no. 33, the Hôtel de Luynes. The building is now destroyed.
- No. 14, the Hôtel de Brienne serves as the official residence of the minister of defense.

== Popular culture ==
The Irish musician Rob Smith released a song in March 2011 called "Rue Sainte-Dominique". The music video was shot on the street and surrounding area.
