= Hôtel de Brienne =

Coordinates: 48°51′35″N 2°19′10″E

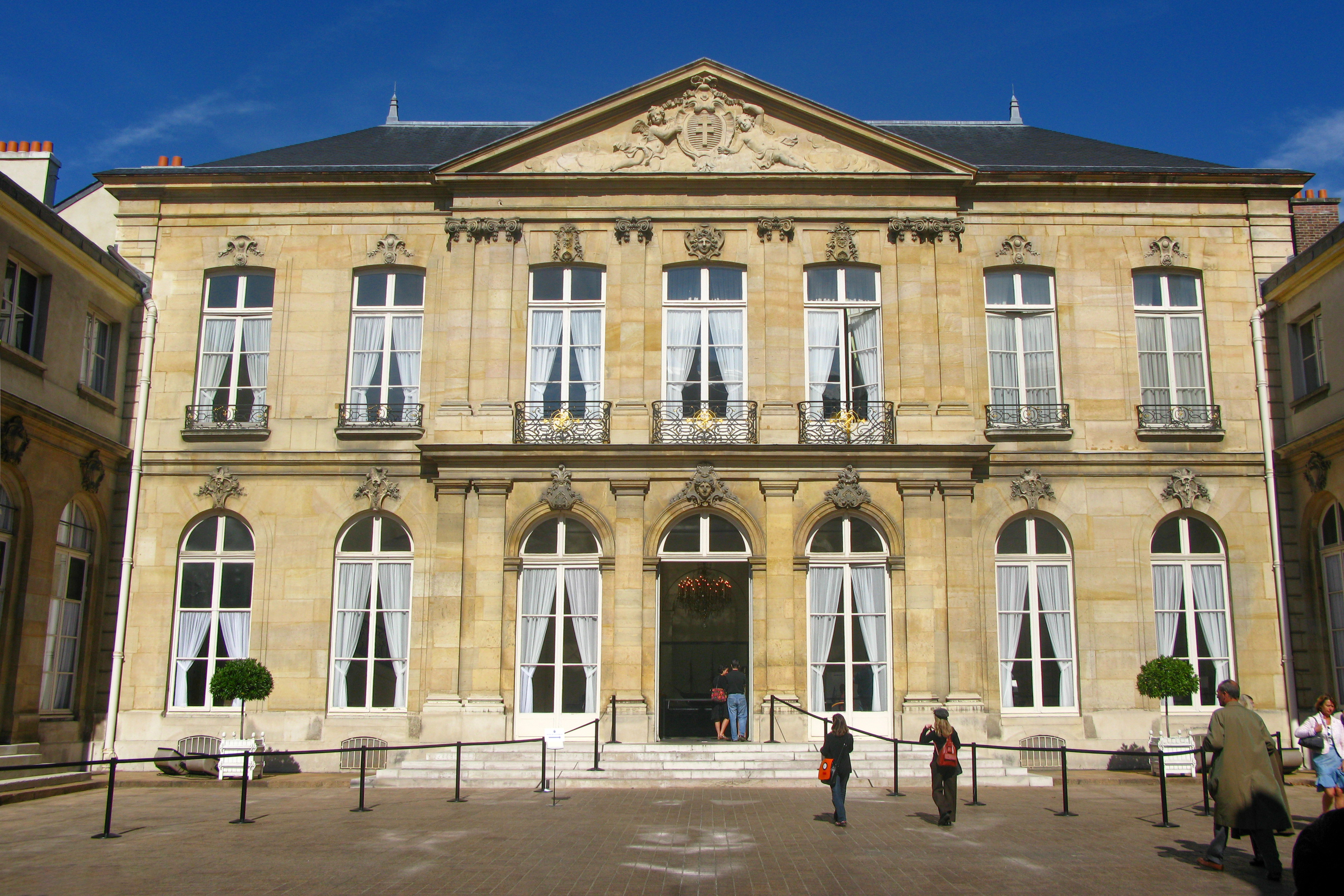
- Interactive map of the Hôtel de Brienne area

General information
- Location: Paris, France, 14 Rue Saint-Dominique

The Hôtel de Brienne (French pronunciation: [otɛl d(ə) bʁijɛn]) is an 18th-century hôtel particulier (a type of townhouse) at 14 Rue Saint-Dominique in the 7th arrondissement of Paris, France. It serves as the official residence of the Minister of the Armed Forces.

It was built in 1724 to the designs of the architect François Debias-Aubry for François Duret, a real estate entrepreneur, who was also president of the Grand Conseil. In 1726 Duret sold it to Françoise de Mailly (widow of Louis Phélypeaux, Marquis de La Vrillière), who allowed her son, Louis Phélypeaux, comte de Saint-Florentin to stay on the upper floor (premier étage). Françoise sold it to Louise Élisabeth de Bourbon, Princesse de Conti in 1733, and it became known as the Hôtel de Conti. It was sold to Athanase Louis Marie de Loménie, comte de Brienne in 1776, when it acquired its current name. Laetizia Bonaparte, Napoleon's mother (Madame Mère), lived here during the First French Empire, and Charles de Gaulle used it as his office at various times during the Second World War. It is currently occupied by the French Ministry of Armed Forces's ministerial cabinet.

== History ==
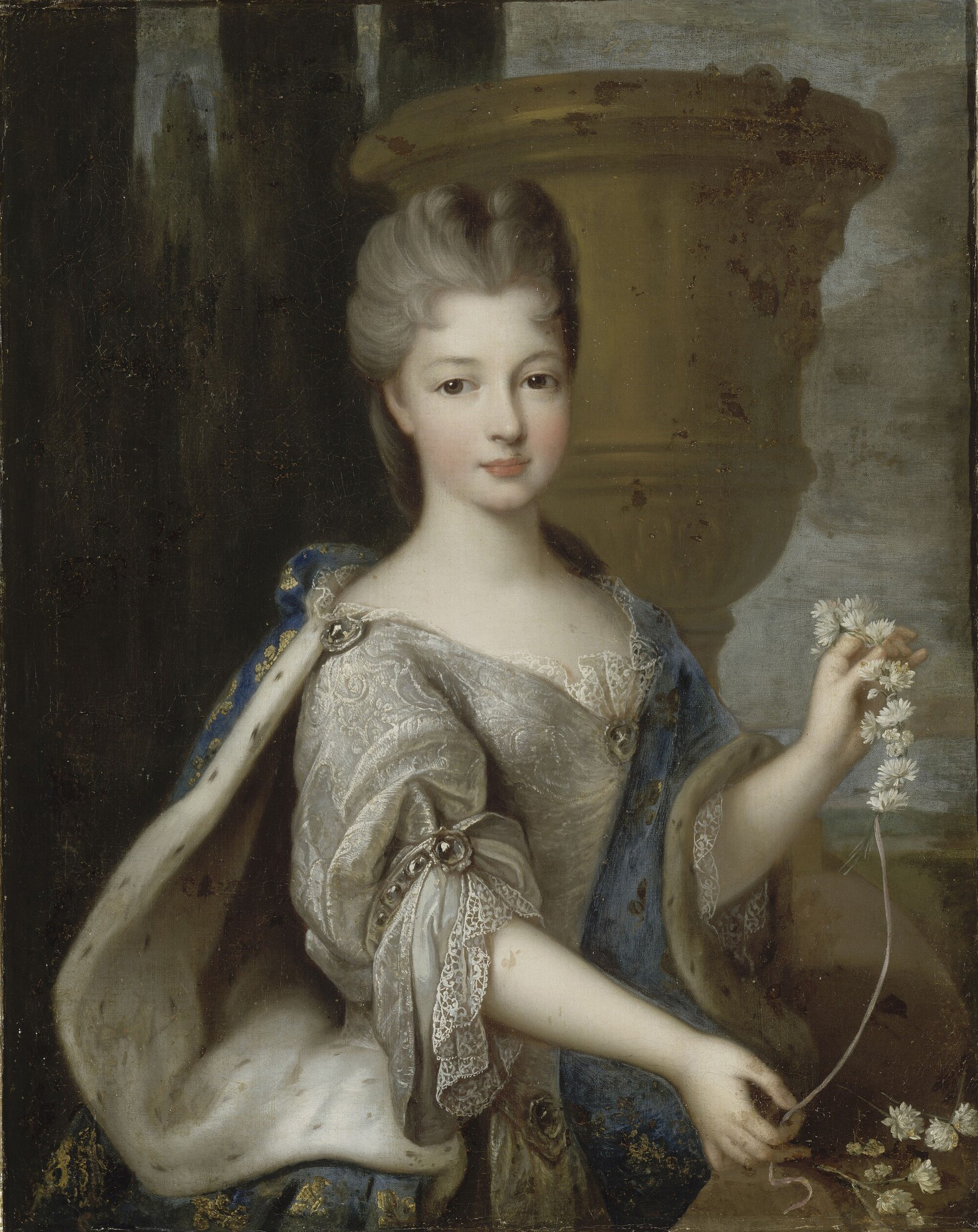
Louise Élisabeth de Bourbon, princesse de Conti, Pierre Gobert.

The Hôtel de Brienne was constructed during the reign of Louis XV, in 1724; it was built by François Debias-Aubry for François Duret, the President of the Grand Conseil. Duret was a friend of the Marquise de Prie, mistress of Louis Henri, Duke of Bourbon (Prime minister of France and another Prince of the Blood). Duret had been ordered to construct it by Madame de Prie who was looking for a suitable residence in Paris. In 1726, the Duke of Bourbon lost favour at Versailles and was exiled to his residence at Chantilly. Following this change of events, the hotel was sold to the widowed Françoise de Mailly, wife of the dead marquis de La Vrillière. Madame de La Vrillière lived at Brienne till 1733 when it was sold to the sister of the disgraced Duke of Bourbon.

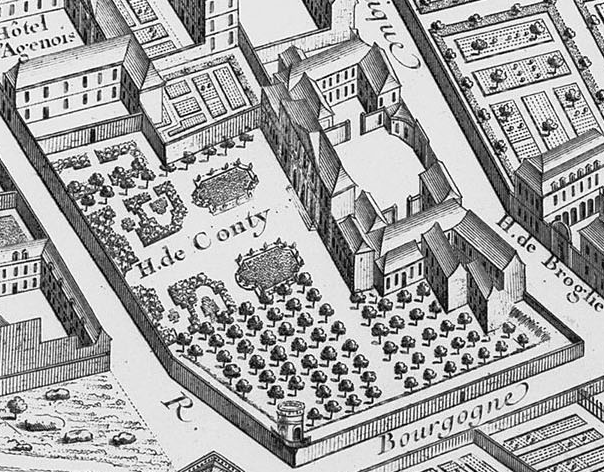
The Hôtel de Conti on the 1739 Turgot map of Paris

Louise Élisabeth de Bourbon, Dowager Princess of Conti bought the hôtel and had the interior designed by the then fashionable interior designer Nicolas Simonnet. The new hôtel was near the Palais Bourbon, built by Louise Élisabeth's mother known as Madame la Duchesse Douairière.

The hotel would be named after the Conti family till 1776, following death of the Dowager Princess in the previous year, when it was sold to the Comte de Briene. It was from him that the present building takes its name. Monsieur de Brienne had bought the property from Louise Élisabeth's grandson Louis François Joseph, Comte de La Marche in late 1775, moving in the next year.

Monsieur de Brienne was executed during The Terror and the building was seized by revolutionaries making the building one of the central places of administration. Under that period it was known as the Commission du commerce et de l'approvisionnement. In 1795, the property was returned to the widowed Comtesse de Brienne. It was then sold to the wife of François Séguy, a businessman related to the military. The building then underwent many changes under the direction of the architect Lavoyepierre.

Victims of financial difficulties, the Séguy couple quickly separated from their new acquisition. In 1800, the hôtel awarded by a court to Joseph Lanfrey, who rent it to Lucien Bonaparte, then Minister of the Interior, and Napoleon's brother.

In 1802, Lucien Bonaparte, acquired the property and again had it redesigned. Three years later in 1805 he sold it to his mother Letizia Ramolino. That is why during the reign of Napoléon, the edifice became known as the le Palais de Madame, Mère de l'Empereur (the Palace of Madame, Emperor's Mother).

Bought from Madame Mère by the state in 1817, the hôtel de Brienne became the home of the Ministry of War. In 1917, during the First World War, Clémenceau then head of the French government, worked on the final victory within its walls. Charles de Gaulle, also worked in the hôtel. First as the secretary of State in June 1940, then as the chief of the provisional government in August 1944 till January 1946.

The building is still the home of the Minister of the Armed Forces.

== See also ==
- Hôtel de Nevers (left bank), home of the Princes of Conti from 1670 to 1749
- Hôtel du Plessis-Guénégaud, home of Anne-Marie Martinozzi, Princesse de Conti from 1660 to 1670

== Bibliography ==
- Gady, Alexandre (2008). Les Hôtels particuliers de Paris du Moyen Âge à la Belle Époque. Paris: Parigramme. ISBN 9782840962137.
- Gallet, Michel (1995). Les Architectes Parisiens du XVIIIe siècle : Dictionnaire biographique et critique, "François Debias-Aubry", pp. 171–173. Paris: Mengès. ISBN 9782856203705.
- Lehrer, Steven (2013). Wartime Sites in Paris. New York: SF Tafel Publishers. ISBN 9781492292920.
