= Ministry of Agriculture (France) =

Government ministry of France

Ministry of Agriculture, Agrifood, and Forestry
- Ministère de l'agriculture, de l'agroalimentaire et de la forêt
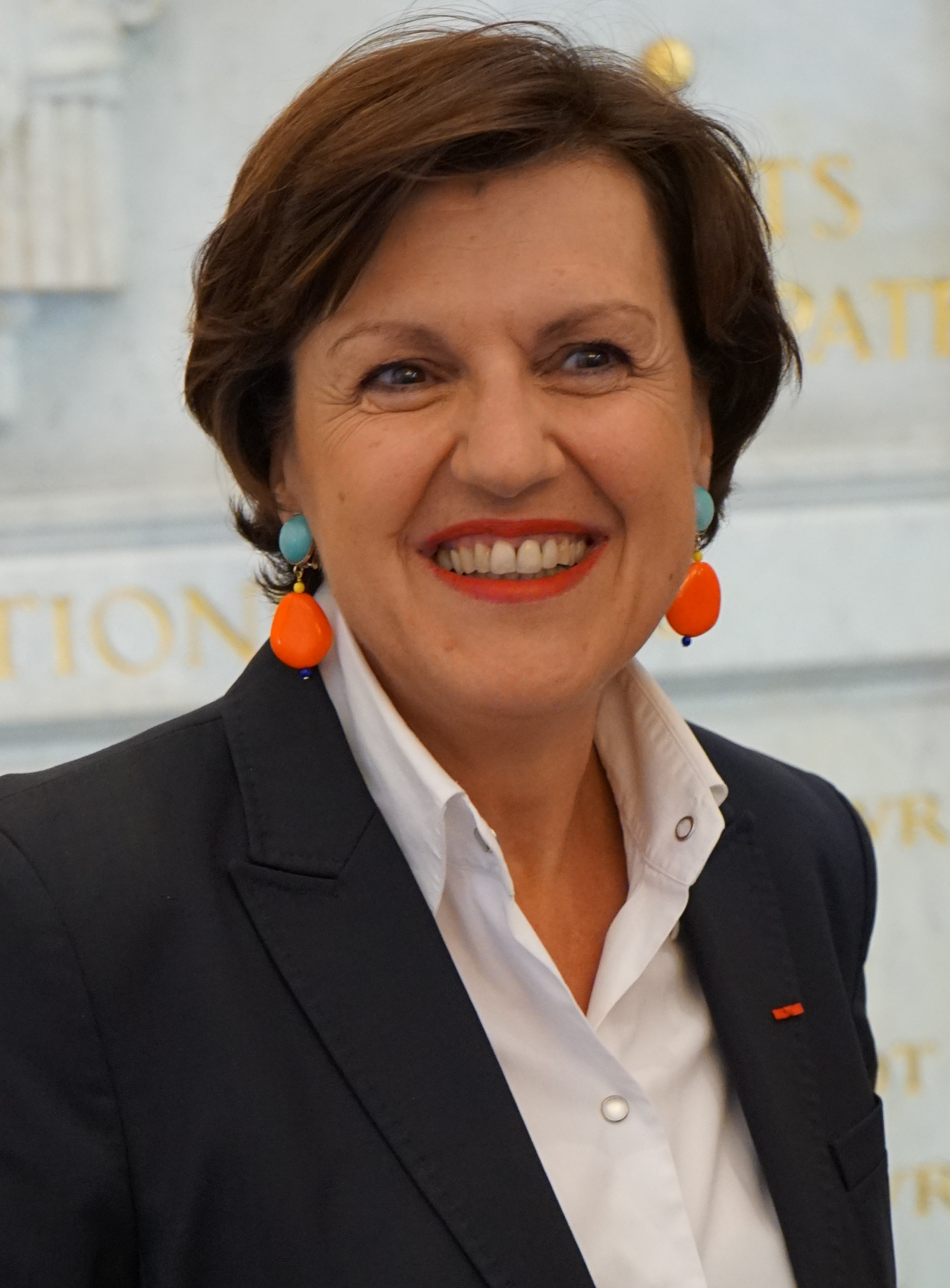
- Incumbent; Annie Genevard since 21 September 2024
- Ministry of Agriculture, Agrifood, and Forestry
- Member of: Cabinet
- Reports to: President of the Republic; Prime Minister
- Seat: Hôtel de Villeroy,78 Rue de Varenne, Paris 7e.
- Nominator: Prime Minister
- Appointer: President of the Republic
- Term length: No fixed term
- Formation: 19 September 1836
- Website: agriculture.gouv.fr

The Ministère de l'Agriculture et de la Souveraineté alimentaire ('ministry of agriculture and food sovereignty') is the French ministry of agriculture – the governmental body charged with regulation and policy for agriculture, food and forestry.

The headquarters are in the Hôtel de Villeroy, at 78 Rue de Varenne in the 7th arrondissement of Paris, adjacent to Hotel Matignon.

Until 21 June 2012 the remit of the ministry was somewhat different; its full title was French: Ministère de l'Agriculture, de l'Alimentation, de la Pêche, de la Ruralité et de l'Aménagement du territoire ('ministry of agriculture, food, fisheries, rural affairs and spatial planning').

The regional directorates for food, agriculture and forests (DRAAFs) oversee the implementation of policies for agriculture, food (particularly health safety), aquaculture and forests. Their missions cover the content and organisation of agricultural education. They contribute to employment policy in the fields of farming, agri-food, forestry and freshwater aquaculture.

== Ministers ==
The minister of agriculture is a cabinet member in the Government of France.

- Alexandre Goüin 1 March 1840 – 29 October 1840
- Paul Devès 14 November 1881 – 30 January 1882
- François de Mahy 30 January 1882 – 21 February 1883
- Jules Méline 21 February 1883 – 6 April 1885
- Hervé Mangon 6 April 1885 – 9 November 1885
- Pierre Gomot 9 November 1885 – 7 January 1886
- Jules Develle 7 January 1886 – 30 May 1887
- François Barbe 30 May 1887 – 12 December 1887
- Jules Viette 12 December 1887 – 22 February 1889
- Léopold Faye 22 February 1889 – 17 March 1890
- Jules Develle 17 March 1890 – 11 January 1893
- Albert Viger 11 January 1893 – 26 January 1895
- Antoine Gadaud 26 January 1895 – 1 November 1895
- Albert Viger 1 November 1895 – 29 April 1896
- Jules Méline 29 April 1896 – 28 June 1898
- Albert Viger 28 June 1898 – 22 June 1899
- Jean Dupuy 22 June 1899 – 7 June 1902
- Léon Mougeot 7 June 1902 – 24 January 1905
- Joseph Ruau 24 January 1905 – 3 November 1910
- Maurice Raynaud 3 November 1910 – 2 March 1911
- Jules Pams 2 March 1911 – 17 January 1913
- Fernand David 21 January 1913 – 22 March 1913
- Étienne Clémentel 22 March 1913 – 9 December 1913
- Maurice Raynaud 9 December 1913 – 9 June 1914
- Adrien Dariac 9 June 1914 – 13 June 1914
- Fernand David 13 June 1914 – 29 October 1915
- Jules Méline 29 October 1915 – 12 December 1916
- Étienne Clémentel 12 December 1916 – 20 March 1917
- Fernand David 20 March 1917 – 16 November 1917
- Victor Boret 16 November 1917 – 20 July 1919
- Joseph Noulens 20 July 1919 – 20 January 1920
- Joseph Ricard 20 January 1920 – 16 January 1921
- Edmond Lefebvre du Prey 16 January 1921 – 15 January 1922
- Henry Chéron 15 January 1922 – 29 March 1924
- Joseph Capus 29 March 1924 – 14 June 1924
- Henri Queuille 14 June 1924 – 17 April 1925
- Jean Durand 17 April 1925 – 10 April 1926
- François Binet 10 April 1926 – 19 July 1926
- Henri Queuille 19 July 1926 – 11 November 1928
- Jean Hennessy 11 November 1928 – 21 February 1930
- Henri Queuille 21 February 1930 – 2 March 1930
- Fernand David 2 March 1930 – 13 December 1930
- Victor Boret 13 December 1930 – 27 January 1931
- André Tardieu 27 January 1931 – 14 January 1932
- Achille Armand Fould 14 January 1932 – 20 February 1932
- Claude Chauveau 20 February 1932 – 3 June 1932
- Abel Gardey 3 June 1932 – 18 December 1932
- Henri Queuille 18 December 1932 – 8 November 1934
- Émile Casset 8 November 1934 – 1 June 1935
- Paul Jacquier 1 June 1935 – 7 June 1935
- Pierre Cathala 7 June 1935 – 24 January 1936
- Paul Thellier 24 January 1936 – 4 June 1936
- Georges Monnet 4 June 1936 – 18 January 1938
- Fernand Chapsal 18 January 1938 – 13 March 1938
- Georges Monnet 13 March 1938 – 10 April 1938
- Henri Queuille 10 April 1938 – 21 March 1940
- Paul Thellier 21 March 1940 – 16 June 1940
- Albert Chichery 16 June 1940 – 12 July 1940
- Pierre Caziot 12 July 1940 – 18 April 1942
- Jacques Le Roy Ladurie 18 April 1942 – 11 September 1942
- Max Bonnafous 11 September 1942 – 6 January 1944
- Pierre Cathala 6 January 1944 – 20 August 1944
- François Tanguy-Prigent 4 September 1944 – 22 October 1947
- Marcel Roclore 22 October 1947 – 24 November 1947
- Pierre Pflimlin 24 November 1947 – 2 December 1949
- Gabriel Valay 2 December 1949 – 3 July 1950
- Pierre Pflimlin 3 July 1950 – 11 August 1951
- Paul Antier 11 August 1951 – 21 November 1951
- Camille Laurens 21 November 1951 – 28 June 1953
- Roger Houdet 28 June 1953 – 23 February 1955
- Jean Sourbet 23 February 1955 – 1 February 1956
- Roland Boscary-Monsservin 6 November 1957 – 9 June 1958
- Roger Houdet 9 June 1958 – 27 May 1959
- Henri Rochereau 27 May 1959 – 24 August 1961
- Edgard Pisani 24 August 1961 – 8 January 1966
- Edgar Faure 8 January 1966 – 10 July 1968
- Robert Boulin 10 July 1968 – 16 June 1969
- Jacques Duhamel 16 June 1969 – 8 January 1971
- Michel Cointat 8 January 1971 – 7 July 1972
- Jacques Chirac 7 July 1972 – 1 March 1974
- Raymond Marcellin 1 March 1974 – 28 May 1974
- Christian Bonnet 28 May 1974 – 30 March 1977
- Pierre Méhaignerie 30 March 1977 – 22 May 1981
- Édith Cresson 22 May 1981 – 22 March 1983
- Michel Rocard 22 March 1983 – 4 April 1985
- Henri Nallet 4 April 1985 – 20 March 1986
- François Guillaume 20 March 1986 – 12 May 1988
- Henri Nallet 12 May 1988 – 2 October 1990
- Louis Mermaz 2 October 1990 – 2 October 1992
- Jean-Pierre Soisson 2 October 1992 – 29 March 1993
- Jean Puech 29 March 1993 – 18 May 1995
- Philippe Vasseur 18 May 1995 – 4 June 1997
- Louis Le Pensec 4 June 1997 – 20 October 1998
- Jean Glavany 20 October 1998 – 25 February 2002
- François Patriat 25 February 2002 – 7 May 2002
- Hervé Gaymard 7 May 2002 – 31 March 2004
- Hervé Gaymard 31 March 2004 – 29 November 2004
- Dominique Bussereau 29 November 2004 – 15 May 2007
- Christine Lagarde 18 May 2007 – 18 June 2007
- Michel Barnier 19 June 2007 – 22 June 2009
- Bruno Le Maire 23 June 2009 – 15 May 2012
- Stéphane Le Foll 16 May 2012 –10 May 2017
- Jacques Mézard 17 May 2017 – 19 June 2017
- Stéphane Travert 21 June 2017 – 16 October 2018
- Didier Guillaume 16 October 2018 – 6 July 2020
- Julien Denormandie 6 July 2020 – 20 May 2022
- Marc Fesneau 20 May 2022 - 21 September 2024
- Annie Genevard 21 September 2024

== See also ==
- Directorate general for Maritime affairs, Fisheries and Aquaculture
