= André Maginot =

French civil servant, soldier and member of parliament

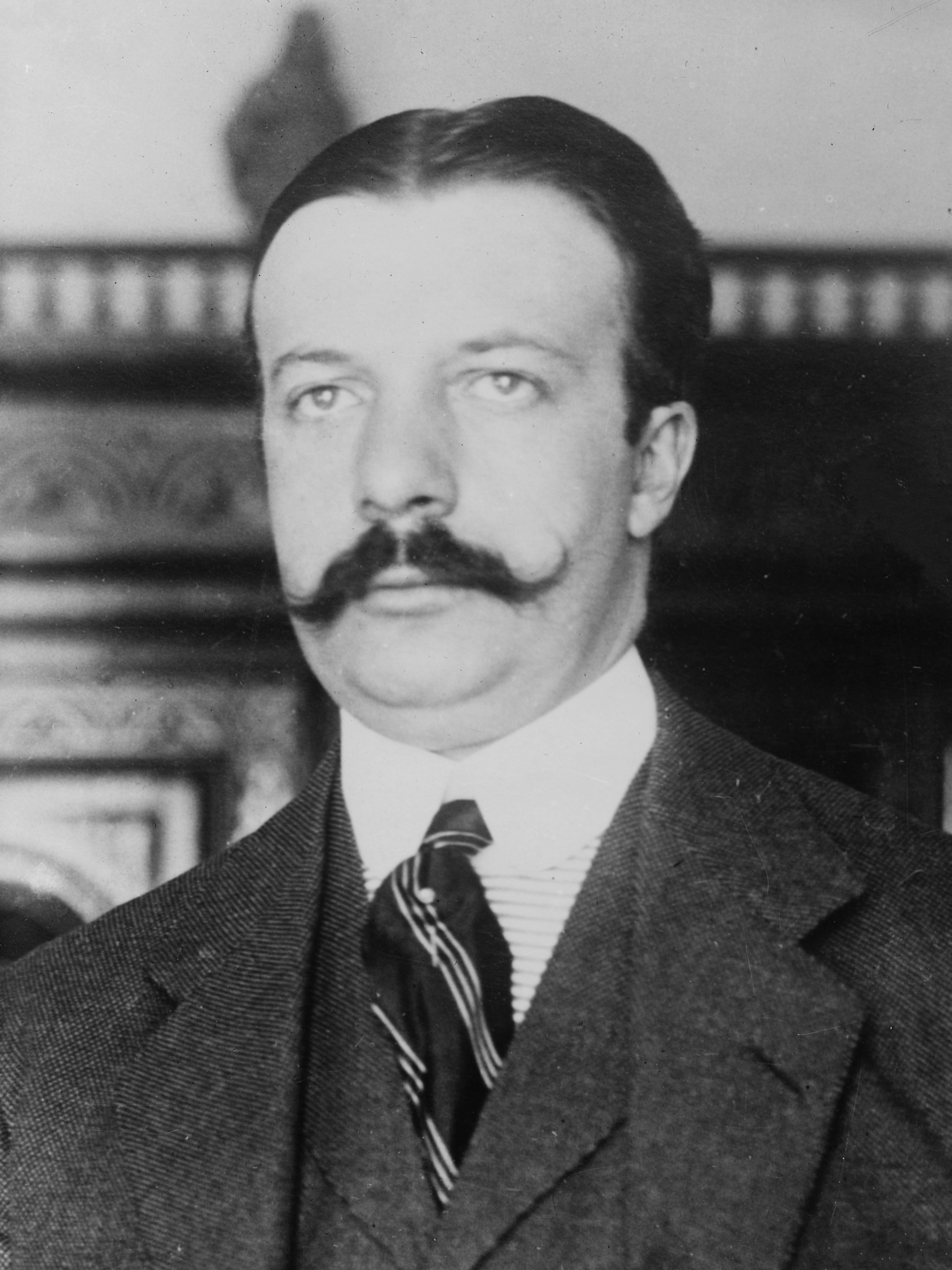
- André Maginot

Minister of War
- In office 27 January 1931 – 6 January 1932
- President: Gaston Doumergue; Paul Doumer
- Prime Minister: Pierre Laval
- Preceded by: Louis Barthou
- Succeeded by: André Tardieu
- In office 2 March 1930 – 13 December 1930
- President: Gaston Doumergue
- Prime Minister: André Tardieu
- Preceded by: René Besnard
- Succeeded by: Louis Barthou
- In office 3 November 1929 – 21 February 1930
- President: Gaston Doumergue
- Prime Minister: André Tardieu
- Preceded by: Paul Painlevé
- Succeeded by: René Besnard

Minister of the Colonies
- In office 11 November 1928 – 22 October 1929
- President: Gaston Doumergue
- Prime Minister: Aristide Briand
- Preceded by: Léon Perrier
- Succeeded by: François Piétri
- In office 20 March 1917 – 7 September 1917
- President: Raymond Poincaré
- Prime Minister: Alexandre Ribot
- Preceded by: Gaston Doumergue
- Succeeded by: René Besnard

Minister of War and Pensions
- In office 15 February 1922 – 14 June 1924
- President: Alexandre Millerand
- Prime Minister: Raymond Poincaré; Frédéric François-Marsal
- Preceded by: Louis Barthou
- Succeeded by: Charles Nollet

Minister of War Pensions and Allowances
- In office 20 January 1920 – 12 January 1922
- President: Raymond Poincaré; Paul Deschanel; Alexandre Millerand
- Prime Minister: Alexandre Millerand; Georges Leygues; Aristide Briand
- Preceded by: Léon Abrami
- Succeeded by: Édouard Bovier-Lapierre

Member of the Chamber of Deputies
- In office 24 April 1910 – 6 January 1932
- Parliamentary group: GD (1910–1914); RGD (1914–1919; GRD (1919–1928; ADS (1928–1932)
- Constituency: Meuse

Personal details
- Born: 17 February 1877 Paris, France
- Died: 7 January 1932 (aged 54) Paris, France
- Awards: Médaille militaire

Military service
- Allegiance: France
- Branch/service: French Army
- Years of service: 1914–1917
- Rank: Sergeant
- Battles/wars: World War I

André Maginot (English: /ˈmæʒɪnoʊ/; French: [ɑ̃dʁe maʒino]; 17 February 1877 – 7 January 1932) was a French civil servant, soldier and Member of Parliament. He is best known for his advocacy of the string of forts known as the Maginot Line.

== Early life ==
Maginot was born and grew up in Paris but spent extended vacations in Revigny-sur-Ornain, the village of his forebears, which was in the part of Lorraine that had not in 1871 been annexed to Germany. After taking the civil service exam in 1897, Maginot began a career in the French bureaucracy that would last the rest of his life. He worked as the assistant of the Governor-General in Algeria until 1910, when he resigned and began his political career. He was elected to the French Chamber of Deputies that year and served as Under-Secretary of State for War prior to the outbreak of the First World War in 1914.

When the war began, Maginot enlisted in the army and was posted along the Lorraine front. In November 1914, Maginot, who had been promoted to sergeant for his "coolness and courage", was wounded in the leg near Verdun, and he would walk with a limp for the rest of his life. For extreme valour, he was awarded the Médaille militaire. He was also a fencer.

== Development of Maginot Line ==
Later in the war, Maginot returned to the Chamber of Deputies and served in a number of government posts, including Minister of Overseas France (20 March 1917 – 12 September 1917, 11 November 1928 – 3 November 1929), Minister of Pensions starting in 1920 and Minister of War (1922–1924, 1929–1930, 1931–1932). He believed that the Treaty of Versailles did not provide France with sufficient security. He pushed for more funds for defence and grew more distrustful of Germany although few in France then wanted to think about the possibility of another war.

Maginot came to advocate building a series of defensive fortifications along the French border with Germany that would include a combination of field positions and permanent concrete forts. He was influenced in that decision by his observations of successful fortifications employed at Verdun during the war. He was also probably influenced by the destruction of his home in Revigny-sur-Ornain, which made him determined to prevent Lorraine from ever being invaded again.

In 1926 Maginot was successful in getting the government to allocate money to build several experimental sections of the defensive line. During a debate concerning the budget in 1926, André Maginot lobbied heavily for the money needed to construct the enormous line of fortifications. He was finally able to persuade Parliament to allocate 3.3 billion francs for the project (the upper house voted 274 to 26 in favor of the project a few days later).

Work on the project progressed rapidly. Maginot visited a work site in October 1930 and expressed satisfaction with the work. He was especially pleased with the work in Lorraine, site of the home where he spent his childhood, and fought for more funding for construction in that area. Maginot was the main proponent for the project, but most of the actual designs for the Maginot Line were the work of the Minister of War for most of 1926 to 1929, Paul Painlevé.

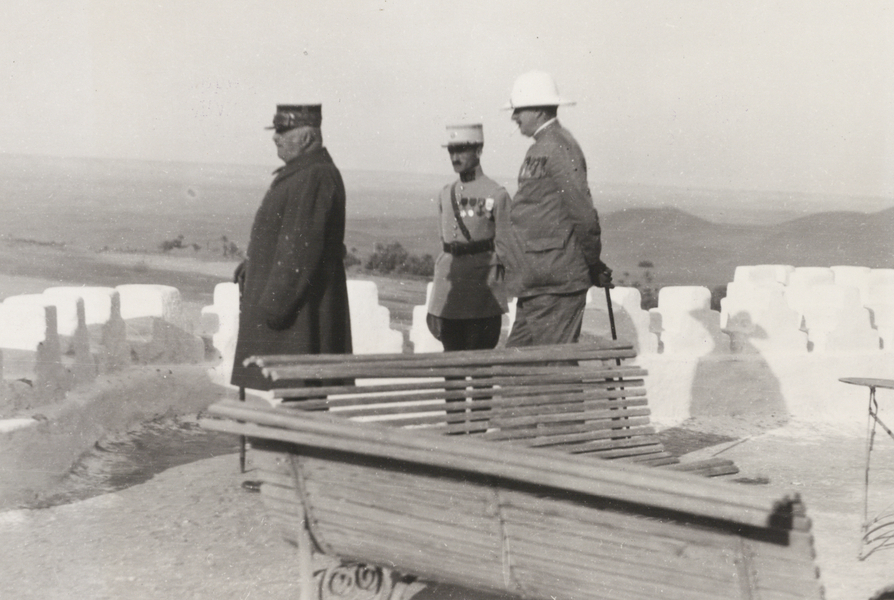
Minister of the Colonies André Maginot and Louis Franchet d'Espèrey in Africa

== Death and legacy ==
André Maginot Memorial, Verdun battlefield, original design Gaston Brouquet, dedicated 1966.

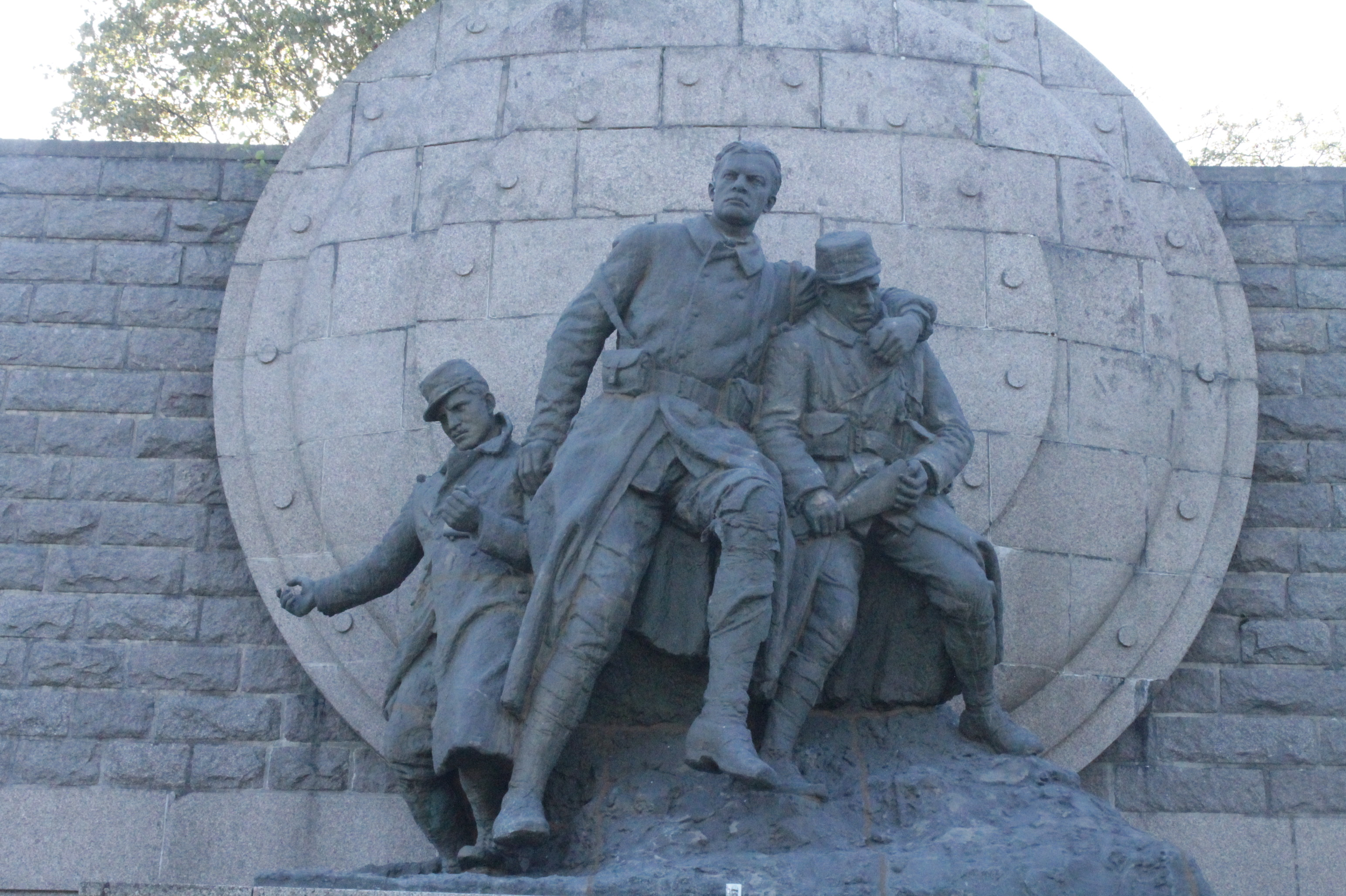
Monument to Andre Maginot, Verdun (close up detail of statuary)

Maginot never saw the line completed, since he became ill in December 1931 and died in Paris on 7 January 1932 of typhoid fever. Many people mourned him throughout France, and it was only after his death that the line of defences that he had advocated came to bear his name.

During the Second World War, Germany bypassed the line by passing Panzers through hills and marshlands, which were impenetrable to tanks when Maginot had made his recommendations.

A monument in memory of Maginot was dedicated near Verdun in September 1966.

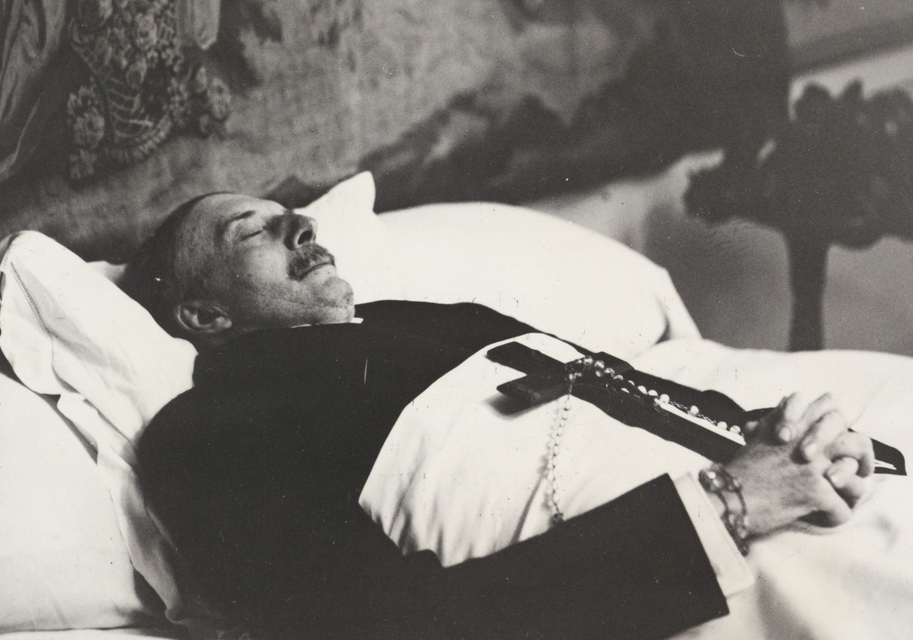
André Maginot, dead

== Quote ==
We could hardly dream of building a kind of Great Wall of France, which would in any case be far too costly. Instead we have foreseen powerful but flexible means of organizing defense, based on the dual principle of taking full advantage of the terrain and establishing a continuous line of fire everywhere.

–10 December 1929

== See also ==
- French Third Republic
