= Aristide Briand =

French statesman (1862–1932)

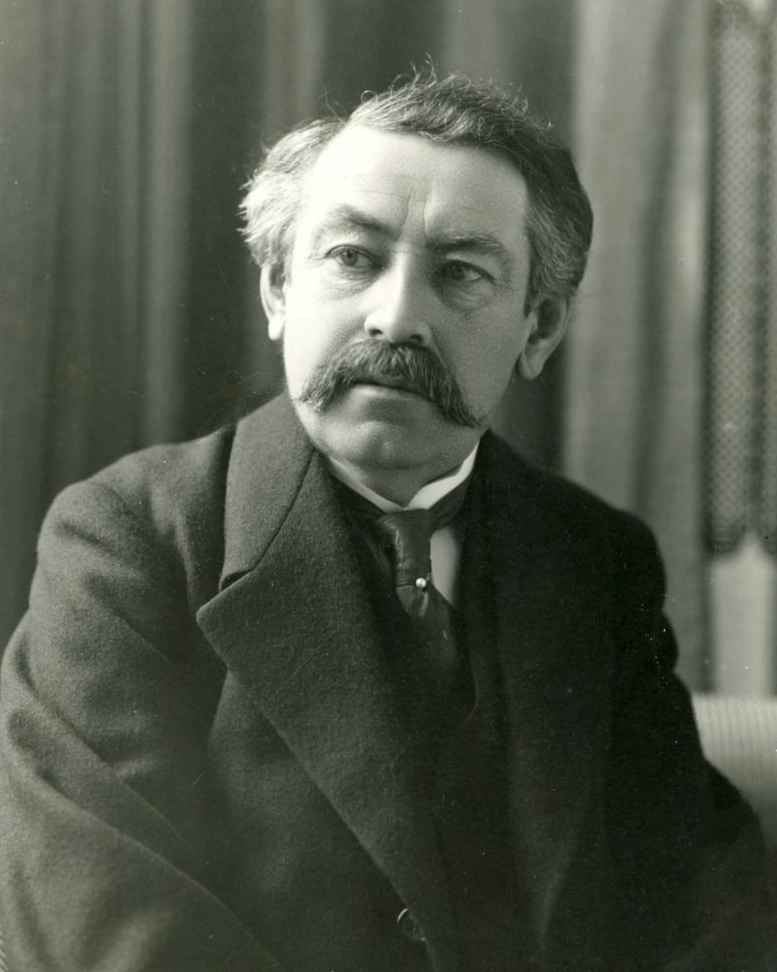
- Briand c. 1920s

Prime Minister of France
- In office 29 July 1929 – 22 October 1929
- President: Gaston Doumergue
- Preceded by: Raymond Poincaré
- Succeeded by: André Tardieu
- In office 28 November 1925 – 17 July 1926
- President: Gaston Doumergue
- Preceded by: Paul Painlevé
- Succeeded by: Édouard Herriot
- In office 16 January 1921 – 12 January 1922
- President: Alexandre Millerand
- Preceded by: Georges Leygues
- Succeeded by: Raymond Poincaré
- In office 29 October 1915 – 17 March 1917
- President: Raymond Poincaré
- Preceded by: René Viviani
- Succeeded by: Alexandre Ribot
- In office 21 January 1913 – 18 March 1913
- President: Armand Fallières
- Preceded by: Raymond Poincaré
- Succeeded by: Louis Barthou
- In office 24 July 1909 – 27 February 1911
- President: Armand Fallières
- Preceded by: Georges Clemenceau
- Succeeded by: Ernest Monis

Minister of Foreign Affairs
- In office 23 July 1926 – 12 January 1932
- Prime Minister: Raymond Poincaré; André Tardieu; Camille Chautemps; Théodore Steeg; Pierre Laval
- Preceded by: Édouard Herriot
- Succeeded by: Pierre Laval

Minister of Justice
- In office 24 August 1914 – 29 October 1915
- Prime Minister: René Viviani
- Preceded by: Jean-Baptiste Bienvenu-Martin
- Succeeded by: René Viviani
- In office 14 January 1912 – 21 January 1913
- Prime Minister: Raymond Poincaré
- Preceded by: Jean Cruppi
- Succeeded by: Louis Barthou
- In office 4 July 1908 – 24 July 1908
- Prime Minister: Georges Clemenceau
- Preceded by: Edmond Guyot-Dessaigne
- Succeeded by: Louis Barthou

Member of the Chamber of Deputies
- In office 27 April 1902 – 7 March 1932
- Constituency: Loire (1902–09); Loire-Inférieure (1909–32)

Personal details
- Born: Aristide Pierre Henri Briand; 28 March 1862 Nantes, Loire-Atlantique, France
- Died: 7 March 1932 (aged 69) Paris, France
- Party: French Socialist Party (1902–1904); Independent Socialists (1904–1911); Republican-Socialist Party (1911–1932)
- Education: University of Paris

Aristide Pierre Henri Briand (French: [aʁistid pjɛʁ ɑ̃ʁi bʁijɑ̃]; 28 March 1862 – 7 March 1932) was a French statesman who served eleven terms as Prime Minister of France during the French Third Republic. He is mainly remembered for his focus on international issues and reconciliation politics during the interwar period (1918–1939).

In 1926, he received the Nobel Peace Prize along with German Foreign Minister Gustav Stresemann for the realization of the Locarno Treaties, which aimed at reconciliation between France and Germany after the First World War. To avoid another worldwide conflict, he was instrumental in the agreement known as the Kellogg–Briand Pact of 1928, as well to establish a "European Union" in 1929. However, all his efforts were compromised by the rise of nationalistic and revanchist ideas like Nazism and fascism following the Great Depression.

== Early life ==
Briand was born in Nantes, Loire-Inférieure (now Loire-Atlantique) of a petit bourgeois family. He attended the Nantes Lycée, where, in 1877, he developed a close friendship with Jules Verne. He studied law at the University of Paris Faculty of Law. After graduating he entered into politics, associating himself with the most advanced movements, writing articles for the syndicalist journal Le Peuple, and directing the Lanterne for some time. From this he passed to the Petite République, leaving it to found L'Humanité, in collaboration with Jean Jaurès.

== Activism ==
At the same time Briand was prominent in the movement for the formation of trade unions, and at the congress of workers at Nantes in 1894, he secured the adoption of the labor union idea against the adherents of Jules Guesde. From that time, Briand was one of the leaders of the French Socialist Party. In 1902, after several unsuccessful attempts, he was elected deputy. He declared himself a strong partisan of the union of the left in what was known as the Bloc, to check the reactionary deputies of the right.

From the beginning of his career in the Chamber of Deputies, Briand was occupied with the question of the separation of church and state. He was appointed the reporter of the commission charged with the preparation of the 1905 law on separation, and his report at once marked him out as one of the coming leaders. He succeeded in carrying his project through with but slight modifications, and without dividing the parties upon whose support he relied.

He was the principal author of the law of separation, but, not content with preparing it; he wished to apply it as well. The ministry of Maurice Rouvier was allowing disturbances during the taking of inventories of church property, a clause of the law for which Briand was not responsible. Consequently, he accepted the portfolio of Public Instruction and Worship in the Sarrien ministry (1906). So far as the chamber was concerned, his success was complete. But the acceptance of a position in a bourgeois ministry led to his exclusion from the Unified Socialist Party (March 1906). As opposed to Jaurès, he contended that the Socialists should co-operate actively with the Radicals in all matters of reform, and not stand aloof to await the complete fulfillment of their ideals. He himself was atheist.

He became a freemason in the lodge Le Trait d'Union in July 1887 while the lodge did not record his name in spite of his repeated requests. Le Trait d'Union Orient de Saint-Nazaire lodge had declared him "unworthy of belonging to the great masonic family on 6 September 1889". In 1895 he joined the lodge Les Chevaliers du Travail that was established in 1893.

== Prime Minister of France ==
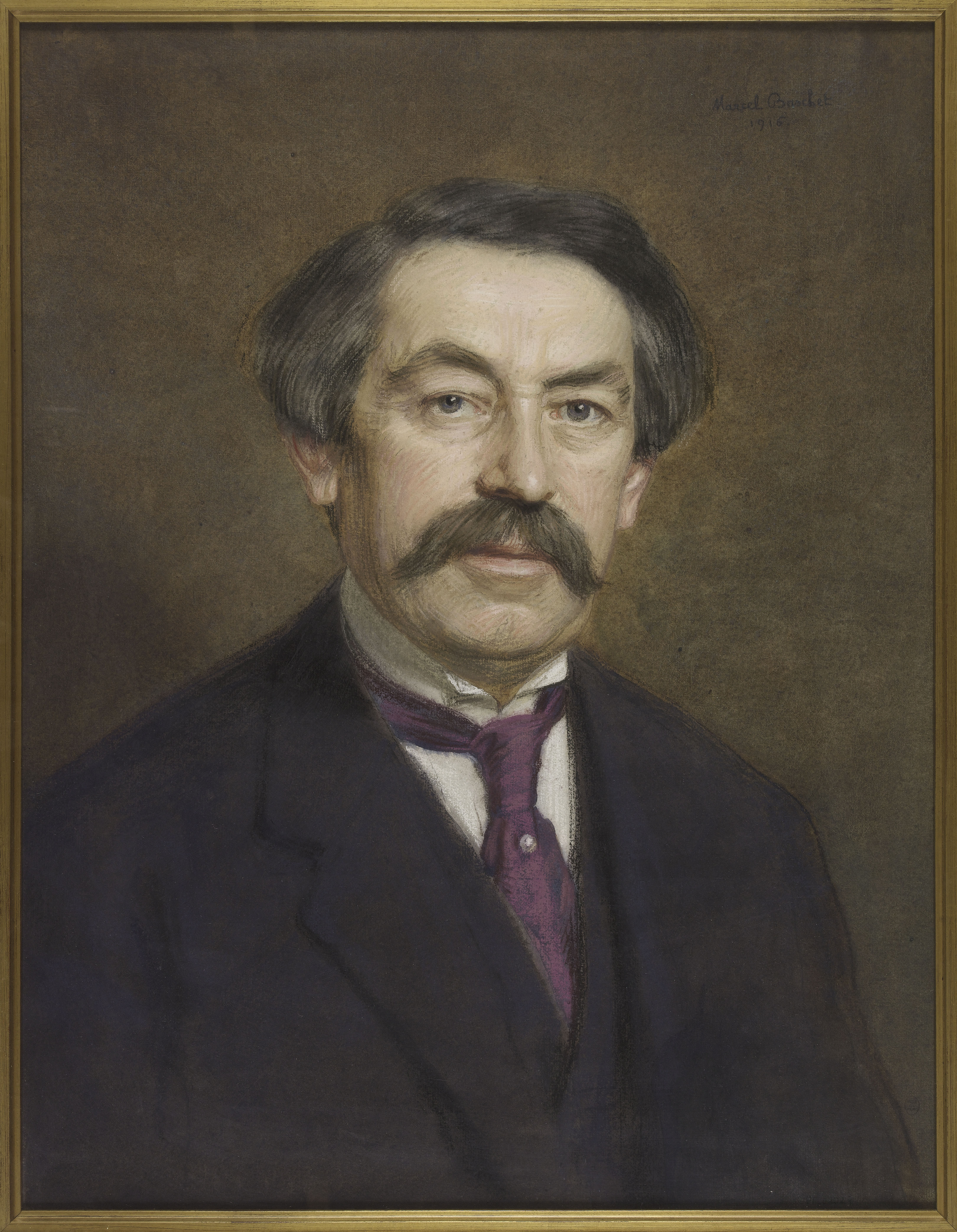
Painting by Marcel Baschet

=== Pre-war ===
Briand served as Minister of Justice under Georges Clemenceau in 1908–9, before succeeding Clemenceau as Prime Minister on 24 July 1909, serving until 2 March 1911. In social policy, Briand's first ministry was notable for the passage of a bill in April 1910 for workers' and farmers' pensions. That same year, compulsory sickness and old-age insurance was introduced for 8 million rural and urban workers. However, a law court decision in 1912 that questioned the legality of compulsion "enabled a large proportion of employers and workers to evade the law." In addition, a law of November 1909 guaranteed employment to women in childbirth, while a partially government subsidized private mutual maternity insurance program was set up, and a law of December 1909 guaranteed the payment of wages at regular intervals.

Briand again served as Minister of Justice 1912-13 under the premiership of the rightwinger Raymond Poincaré (soon to become president of the Republic), before again becoming prime minister for a few months from 21 January 1913 until 22 March 1913.

=== First World War ===
==== 1914–15 ====
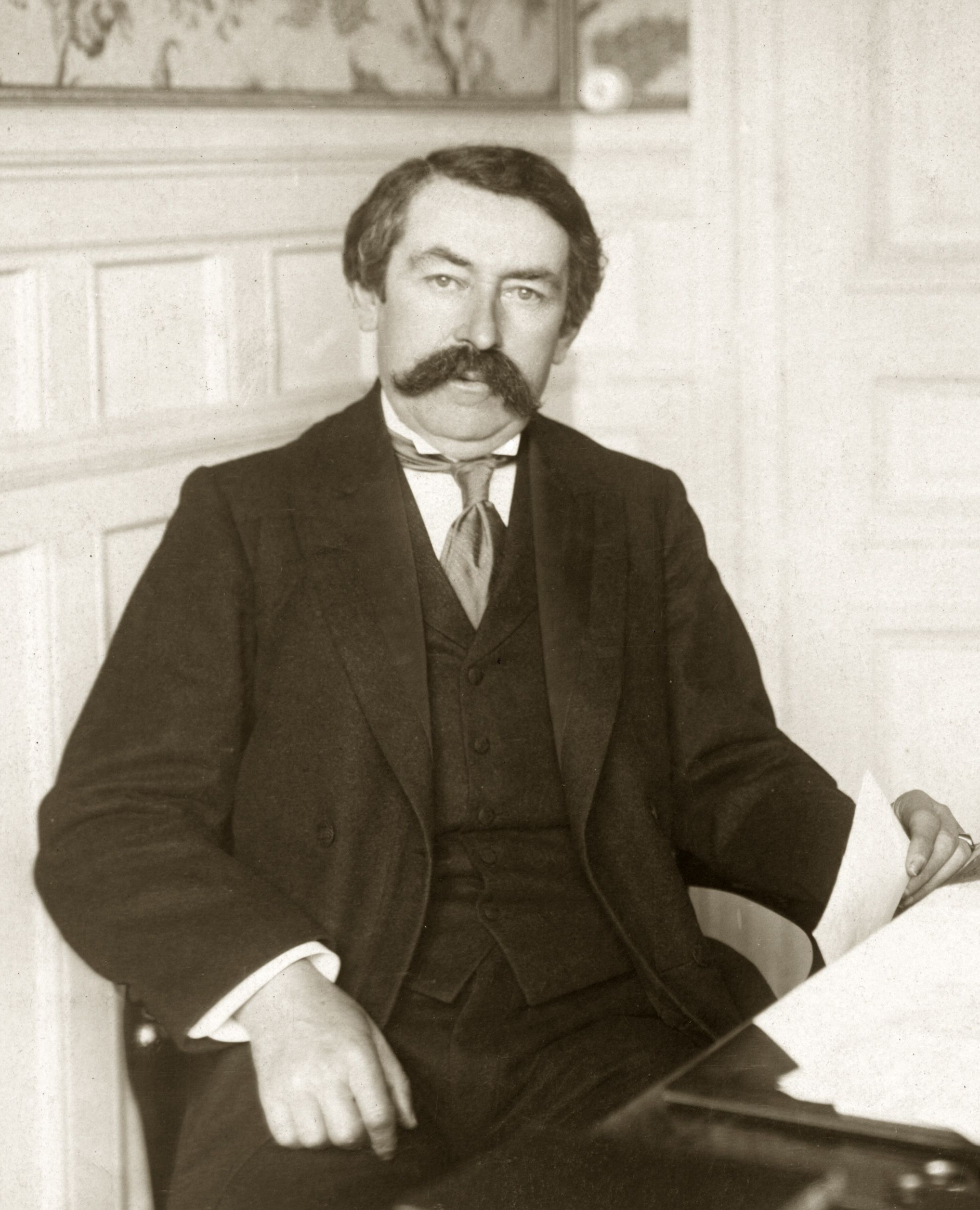
Aristide Briand

At the end of August 1914, following the outbreak of the First World War, Briand again became minister of justice when René Viviani reconstructed his ministry. In the winter of 1914–15 Briand was one of those who pushed for an expedition to Salonika, in the hope of helping Serbia, and perhaps bringing Greece, Romania, Bulgaria and Italy into the war as a pro-French bloc, which would also act as a barrier to future Russian expansion in the Balkans. He got on well with Lloyd George, who was also, contrary to military advice, keen for operations in the Balkans, and had a long talk with him on 4 February 1915. Briand was the main mover in persuading Maurice Sarrail to accept the Salonika command in August 1915.

In October 1915 following an unsuccessful French offensive and the entry of Bulgaria, Briand again became prime minister (29 October 1915), succeeding René Viviani. He also became foreign minister for the first time, a post held by Théophile Delcassé until the final weeks of the previous government. He was also pledged to "unité de front", not just between the military and Parliament but also closer links with the other Allies, a pledge met with "prolonged, thunderous applause" by the deputies.

Draft proposals for Allied cooperation, prepared by Lord Esher and Maurice Hankey were on the table by the time British prime minister H. H. Asquith visited Paris on 17 November (mainly to discuss Greece, and only his second wartime talks with France; the first had been with Viviani in July 1915).

The opening weeks of Briand's ministry required him to broker an agreement between General Gallieni, the new War Minister, and General Joffre, newly (2 December) promoted to "Commander-in-Chief of the French Armies" (generalissimo) over all theatres apart from North Africa.

==== 1916 ====
In the poisonous atmosphere after the opening of the German attack at Verdun (21 February 1916), Gallieni read an angry report at the Council of Ministers on 7 March criticising Joffre's conduct of operations over the last eighteen months and demanding ministerial control, then resigned. He was falsely suspected of wanting to launch a military takeover of the government. Briand knew that publication of the report would damage morale and might bring down the government. Gallieni was persuaded to remain in office until a replacement had been agreed. General Roques was appointed after it had been ensured that Joffre had no objections.

The first formal Allied conference met in Paris on 26 March 1916 (Italy did not participate) but initially made little impact, perhaps because Briand had vetoed the British suggestion of a permanent secretariat, or perhaps because there had been three informal sets of Anglo-French talks in the last quarter of 1915, one of which, the Chantilly meeting, had already seen strategy plans drawn up.

Late in March 1916 Joffre and Briand blocked the withdrawal of five British divisions from Salonika. Briand was widely suspected of wanting to help his mistress Princess George of Greece, who was born a Bonaparte. In the spring of 1916 Briand urged Sarrail to take the offensive in the Balkans to take some of the heat off Verdun, although the British, preoccupied with the upcoming Somme offensive, declined to send further troops and Sarrail's offensive that summer was not a success. Briand also attended the conference at Saleux on 31 May 1916 about the upcoming Anglo-French offensive on the Somme, with President Poincaré (on whose train it was held), General Foch (commander, Army Group North) and the British Commander-in-Chief General Haig.

The first Secret Session of the Chamber of Deputies was held in June 1916 to discuss the shortcomings of the defence at Verdun. The government won a vote of confidence but with a clause demanding "effective supervision" of the army. The Parliamentary Army Commission elected Abel Ferry as a commissioner (1 August). By October Ferry was presenting his fourth report on army railways, to Joffre's fury.

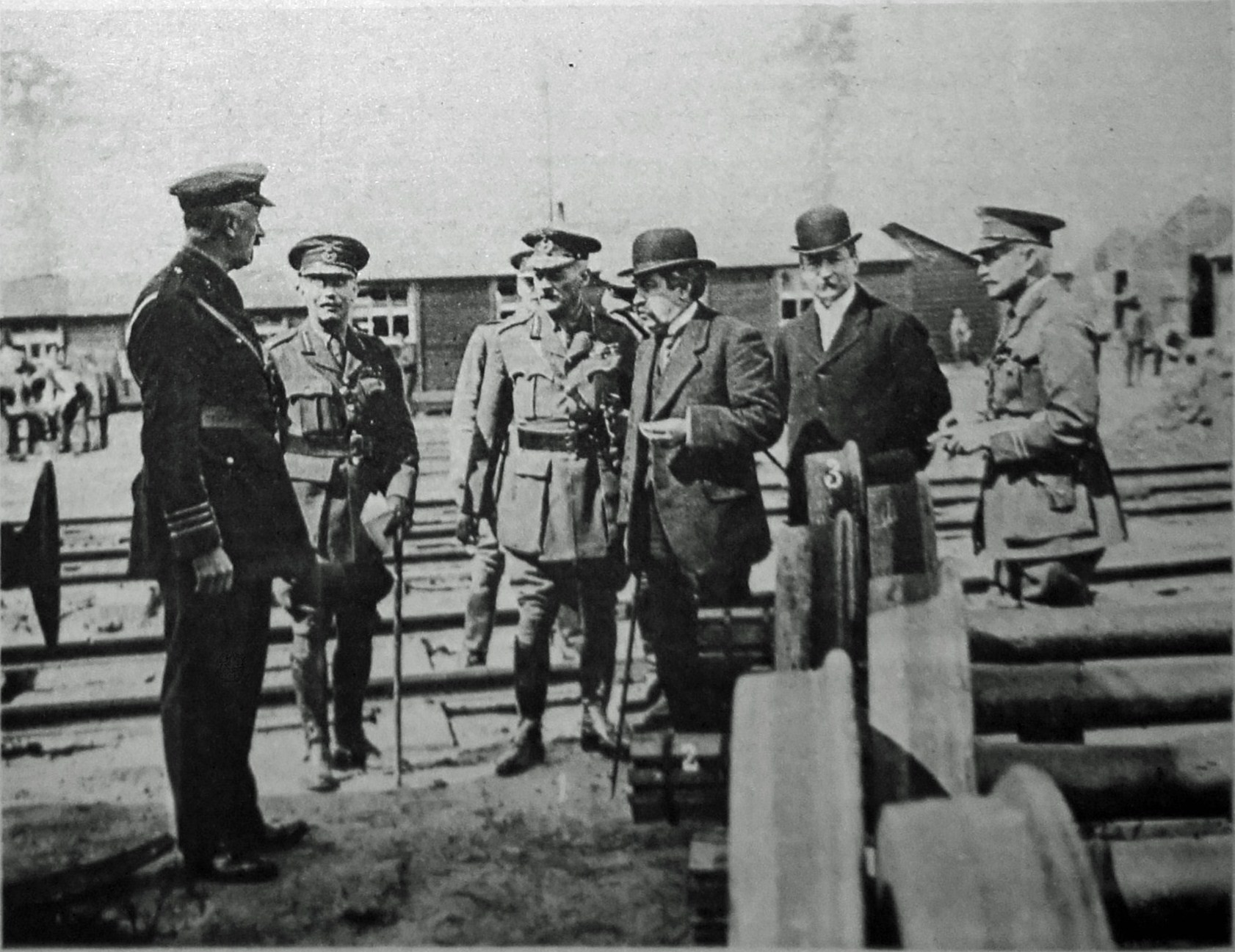
Briand with British Army officer John Maxwell

Late in 1916 Roques had been sent on a fact-finding mission to Salonika after Britain, Italy and Russia had pushed for the dismissal of the theatre commander Sarrail. To Briand's and Joffre's surprise, Roques returned recommending that Sarrail be reinforced and that Sarrail no longer report to Joffre. Coming on the back of the disappointing results of the Somme campaign and the defeat of Romania, Roques' report further discredited Briand and Joffre and added to the Parliamentary Deputies' demands for a closed session. In November Ferry presented a report on the shortage of manpower. A secret session was held on 21 November about calling up the Class of 1918 followed by another a week later.

On 27 November Briand proposed that Joffre be effectively demoted to commander-in-chief in northern France, with both he and Sarrail reporting to the War Minister, although he withdrew this proposal after Joffre threatened resignation. The Closed Session began on 28 November and lasted until 7 December. Briand had little choice but to make concessions to preserve his government, and in a speech of 29 November he promised to repeal Joffre's promotion of December 1915 and in vague terms to appoint a general as technical adviser to the government. Briand survived a confidence vote by 344-160 (six months earlier he had won a confidence vote 440-80).

==== Reconstructed government ====
On 13 December Briand formed a new government, reducing the size of the Council of Ministers from 23 to 10 and replacing Roques with General Lyautey. That day his government survived a vote of confidence by 30 votes, and Joffre was appointed "general-in-chief of the French armies, technical adviser to the government, consultative member of the War Committee" (he was persuaded to accept by Briand, but soon found that he had been stripped of real power and asked to be relieved altogether on 26 December), with Robert Nivelle replacing him as commander-in-chief of the Armies of the North and Northeast.

A Senate Secret Session on 21 December attacked Briand's plans for a smaller war cabinet as "yet another level of bureaucracy"; on 23 December Briand pledged that he would continue to push for a "permanent Allied bureau" to secure constant cooperation between the Allied nations. Briand's reduced War Cabinet was formed in imitation of the small executive body formed by Lloyd George, just appointed Prime Minister of Britain, but in practice Briand's often met just prior to meetings of the main Cabinet. Paul Painlevé declined the job of War Minister as he would have preferred Philippe Pétain as commander-in-chief rather than the inexperienced Nivelle. Like President Poincaré, Briand had thought Pétain too cautious to be suitable.

Nivelle's appointment caused great friction between the British and French high commands, after Lloyd George attempted to have Haig placed under Nivelle's command at the Calais Conference in January. Briand only reluctantly agreed to attend another allied conference in London (12–13 March 1917) to resolve the matter. Briand resigned as prime minister on 20 March 1917 as a result of disagreements over the prospective Nivelle Offensive, to be succeeded by Alexandre Ribot.

=== 1920s ===
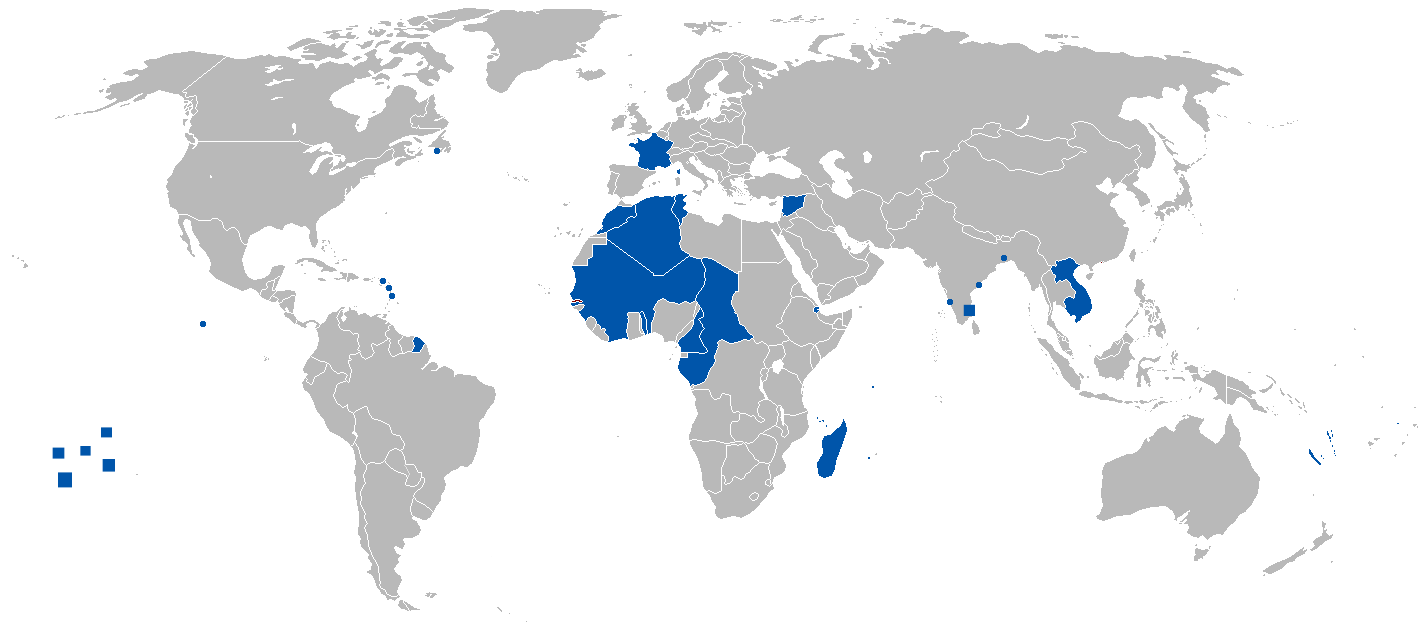
The French colonial empire in the 1920s

Briand returned to power in 1921. He supervised the French role in the Washington Naval Conference of 1921–22. Three factors guided the French strategy and necessitated a Mediterranean focus: the French navy needed to carry a great many goods, the Mediterranean was the axis of chief interest, and a supply of oil was essential. The primary goal was to defend French North Africa, and Briand made practical choices, for naval policy was a reflection of overall foreign policy. The Conference agreed on the American proposal that capital ships be limited to a ratio of 5 to 5 to 3 for the United States, Britain, and Japan, with Italy and France allocated 1.7 each. France's participation reflected its need to deal with its diminishing power and reduced human, material, and financial resources.

Briand's efforts to come to an agreement over reparations with the Germans failed in the wake of German intransigence. The immediate cause of Briand's forced resignation was a seemingly trivial incident during the Cannes Conference of 1922. Pressured into a game of golf by David Lloyd George he played so badly that opposition factions in the National Assembly were able to portray him as both inept and a British sycophant. He was succeeded by the more bellicose Raymond Poincaré. In the wake of the Ruhr Crisis, however, Briand's more conciliatory style became more acceptable, and he returned to the Quai d'Orsay in 1925. He would remain foreign minister until his death in 1932. During this time, he was a member of 14 cabinets, four of which he headed himself in 1925–1926 and 1929.

Briand negotiated the Briand-Ceretti Agreement with the Vatican, giving the French government a role in the appointment of Catholic bishops.

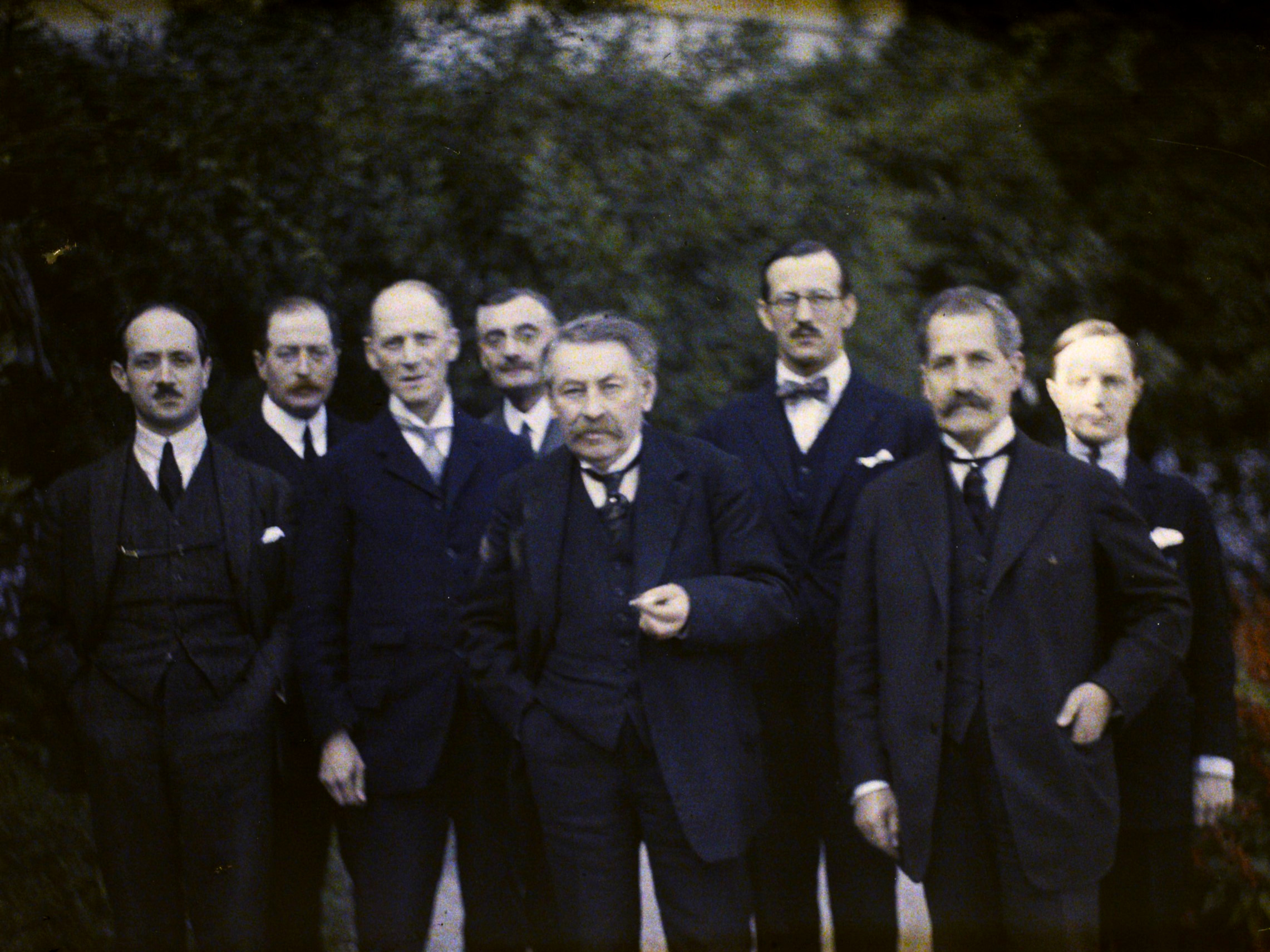
Briand (centre) with members of the French delegation including Henri Fromageot and Philippe Berthelot at the Locarno Treaties, 1925 Autochrome by Roger Dumas

== Kellogg–Briand Pact ==
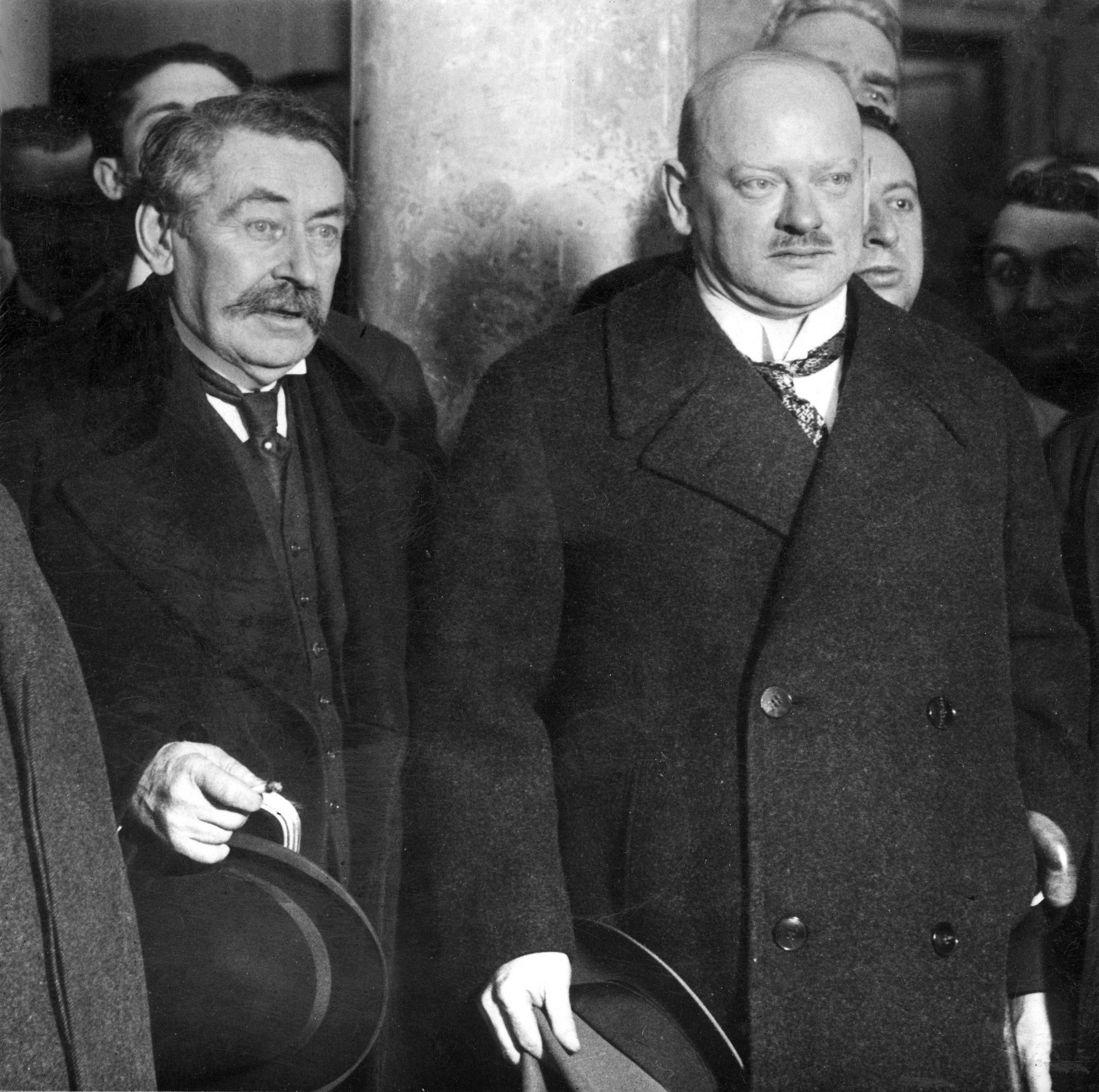
Aristide Briand and Gustav Stresemann

Aristide Briand received the 1926 Nobel Peace Prize together with Gustav Stresemann of Germany for the Locarno Treaties (Austen Chamberlain of the United Kingdom had received a share of the Peace Prize a year earlier for the same agreement).

A 1927 proposal by Briand and United States Secretary of State Frank B. Kellogg for a universal pact outlawing war led the following year to the Pact of Paris, aka the Kellogg–Briand Pact.

== Briand plan for European federation ==
As foreign minister Briand formulated an original proposal for a new economic union of Europe. Described as Briand's Locarno diplomacy and as an aspect of Franco-German rapprochement, it was his answer to Germany's quick economic recovery and future political power. Briand made his proposals in a speech in favor of a European Union in the League of Nations on 5 September 1929, and in 1930, in his "Memorandum on the Organization of a Regime of European Federal Union" for the Government of France.

The idea was to provide a framework to contain France's former enemy while preserving as much of the 1919 Versailles settlement as possible. The Briand plan entailed the economic collaboration of the great industrial areas of Europe and the provision of political security to Eastern Europe against Soviet threats. The basis was economic cooperation, but his fundamental concept was political, for it was political power that would determine economic choices. The plan, under the Memorandum on the Organization of a System of European Federal Union, was in the end presented as a French initiative to the League of Nations. With the death of his principal supporter, German foreign minister Gustav Stresemann, and the onset of the Great Depression in 1929, Briand's plan was never adopted but it suggested an economic framework for developments after World War II that eventually resulted in the European Union.

== Governments ==
=== First (24 July 1909 – 3 November 1910) ===
- Aristide Briand – President of the Council and Minister of the Interior and Worship
- Stéphen Pichon – Minister of Foreign Affairs
- Jean Brun – Minister of War
- Georges Cochery – Minister of Finance
- René Viviani – Minister of Labour and Social Security Provisions
- Louis Barthou – Minister of Justice
- Auguste Boué de Lapeyrère – Minister of Marine
- Gaston Doumergue – Minister of Public Instruction and Fine Arts
- Joseph Ruau – Minister of Agriculture
- Georges Trouillot – Minister of Colonies
- Alexandre Millerand – Minister of Public Works, Posts, and Telegraphs
- Jean Dupuy – Minister of Commerce and Industry

=== Second (3 November 1910 – 2 March 1911) ===
- Aristide Briand – President of the Council and Minister of the Interior and Worship
- Stéphen Pichon – Minister of Foreign Affairs
- Jean Brun – Minister of War
- Louis Lucien Klotz – Minister of Finance
- Louis Lafferre – Minister of Labour and Social Security Provisions
- Théodore Girard – Minister of Justice
- Auguste Boué de Lapeyrère – Minister of Marine
- Maurice Faure – Minister of Public Instruction and Fine Arts
- Maurice Raynaud – Minister of Agriculture
- Jean Morel – Minister of Colonies
- Louis Puech – Minister of Public Works, Posts, and Telegraphs
- Jean Dupuy – Minister of Commerce and Industry

Changes

- 23 February 1911 – Briand succeeds Brun as interim Minister of War.

=== Third and fourth (21 January – 22 March 1913) ===
- Aristide Briand – President of the Council and Minister of the Interior
- Charles Jonnart – Minister of Foreign Affairs
- Eugène Étienne – Minister of War
- Louis Lucien Klotz – Minister of Finance
- René Besnard – Minister of Labour and Social Security Provisions
- Louis Barthou – Minister of Justice
- Pierre Baudin – Minister of Marine
- Théodore Steeg – Minister of Public Instruction and Fine Arts
- Fernand David – Minister of Agriculture
- Jean Morel – Minister of Colonies
- Jean Dupuy – Minister of Public Works, Posts, and Telegraphs
- Gabriel Guist'hau – Minister of Commerce and Industry

=== Fifth (29 October 1915 – 12 December 1916) ===
- Aristide Briand – President of the Council and Minister of Foreign Affairs
- Joseph Galliéni – Minister of War
- Louis Malvy – Minister of the Interior
- Alexandre Ribot – Minister of Finance
- Albert Métin – Minister of Labour and Social Security Provisions
- René Viviani – Minister of Justice
- Lucien Lacaze – Minister of Marine
- Paul Painlevé – Minister of Public Instruction and Fine Arts
- Jules Méline – Minister of Agriculture
- Gaston Doumergue – Minister of Colonies
- Marcel Sembat – Minister of Public Works
- Étienne Clémentel – Minister of Commerce, Industry, Posts, and Telegraphs
- Léon Bourgeois – Minister of State
- Denys Cochin – Minister of State
- Émile Combes – Minister of State
- Charles de Freycinet – Minister of State
- Jules Guesde – Minister of State

Changes

- 15 November 1915 – Paul Painlevé becomes Minister of Inventions for the National Defense in addition to being Minister of Public Instruction and Fine Arts.
- 16 March 1916 – Pierre Auguste Roques succeeds Galliéni as Minister of War

=== Sixth (12 December 1916 – 20 March 1917) ===
- Aristide Briand – President of the Council and Minister of Foreign Affairs
- Hubert Lyautey – Minister of War
- Albert Thomas – Minister of Armaments and War Manufacturing
- Louis Malvy – Minister of the Interior
- Alexandre Ribot – Minister of Finance
- Étienne Clémentel – Minister of Commerce, Industry, Labour, Social Security Provisions, Agriculture, Posts, and Telegraphs
- René Viviani – Minister of Justice, Public Instruction, and Fine Arts
- Lucien Lacaze – Minister of Marine
- Édouard Herriot – Minister of Supply, Public Works, and Transport
- Gaston Doumergue – Minister of Colonies

Changes

- 15 March 1917 – Lucien Lacaze succeeds Lyautey as interim Minister of War.

=== Seventh (16 January 1921 – 15 January 1922) ===
- Aristide Briand – President of the Council and Minister of Foreign Affairs
- Louis Barthou – Minister of War
- Pierre Marraud – Minister of the Interior
- Paul Doumer – Minister of Finance
- Charles Daniel-Vincent – Minister of Labour
- Laurent Bonnevay – Minister of Justice
- Gabriel Guist'hau – Minister of Marine
- Léon Bérard – Minister of Public Instruction and Fine Arts
- André Maginot – Minister of War Pensions, Grants, and Allowances
- Edmond Lefebvre du Prey – Minister of Agriculture
- Albert Sarraut – Minister of Colonies
- Yves Le Trocquer – Minister of Public Works
- Georges Leredu – Minister of Hygiene, Welfare Work, and Social Security Provisions
- Lucien Dior – Minister of Commerce and Industry
- Louis Loucheur – Minister of Liberated Regions

=== Eighth (28 November 1925 – 9 March 1926) ===
- Aristide Briand – President of the Council and Minister of Foreign Affairs
- Paul Painlevé – Minister of War
- Camille Chautemps – Minister of the Interior
- Louis Loucheur – Minister of Finance
- Antoine Durafour – Minister of Labour, Hygiene, Welfare Work, and Social Security Provisions
- René Renoult – Minister of Justice
- Georges Leygues – Minister of Marine
- Édouard Daladier – Minister of Public Instruction and Fine Arts
- Paul Jourdain – Minister of Pensions
- Jean Durand – Minister of Agriculture
- Léon Perrier – Minister of Colonies
- Anatole de Monzie – Minister of Public Works
- Charles Daniel-Vincent – Minister of Commerce and Industry

Changes

- 16 December 1925 – Paul Doumer succeeds Loucheur as Minister of Finance.

=== Ninth (9 March – 23 June 1926) ===
- Aristide Briand – President of the Council and Minister of Foreign Affairs
- Paul Painlevé – Minister of War
- Louis Malvy – Minister of the Interior
- Raoul Péret – Minister of Finance
- Antoine Durafour – Minister of Labour, Hygiene, Welfare Work, and Social Security Provisions
- Pierre Laval – Minister of Justice
- Georges Leygues – Minister of Marine
- Lucien Lamoureux – Minister of Public Instruction and Fine Arts
- Paul Jourdain – Minister of Pensions
- Jean Durand – Minister of Agriculture
- Léon Perrier – Minister of Colonies
- Anatole de Monzie – Minister of Public Works
- Charles Daniel-Vincent – Minister of Commerce and Industry

Changes

- 10 April 1926 – Jean Durand succeeds Malvy as Minister of the Interior. François Binet succeeds Durand as Minister of Agriculture.

=== Tenth (23 June – 19 July 1926) ===
- Aristide Briand – President of the Council and Minister of Foreign Affairs
- Adolphe Guillaumat – Minister of War
- Jean Durand – Minister of the Interior
- Joseph Caillaux – Minister of Finance, Vice President of the Council
- Antoine Durafour – Minister of Labour, Hygiene, Welfare Work, and Social Security Provisions
- Pierre Laval – Minister of Justice
- Georges Leygues – Minister of Marine
- Bertrand Nogaro – Minister of Public Instruction and Fine Arts
- Paul Jourdain – Minister of Pensions
- François Binet – Minister of Agriculture
- Léon Perrier – Minister of Colonies
- Charles Daniel-Vincent – Minister of Public Works
- Fernand Chapsal – Minister of Commerce and Industry

=== Eleventh (29 July – 3 November 1929) ===
- Aristide Briand – President of the Council and Minister of Foreign Affairs
- Paul Painlevé – Minister of War
- André Tardieu – Minister of the Interior
- Henry Chéron – Minister of Finance
- Louis Loucheur – Minister of Labour, Hygiene, Welfare Work, and Social Security Provisions
- Louis Barthou – Minister of Justice
- Georges Leygues – Minister of Marine
- Laurent Eynac – Minister of Air
- Pierre Marraud – Minister of Public Instruction and Fine Arts
- Louis Antériou – Minister of Pensions
- Jean Hennessy – Minister of Agriculture
- André Maginot – Minister of Colonies
- Pierre Forgeot – Minister of Public Works
- Georges Bonnefous – Minister of Commerce and Industry

== See also ==
- Interwar France
- List of people on the cover of Time magazine: 1920s

== Notes ==
Political offices
Preceded by Jean-Baptiste Bienvenu-Martin	Minister of Public Instruction and Fine Arts; 1906–1908	Succeeded by Gaston Doumergue
Preceded by Jean-Baptiste Bienvenu-Martin	Minister of Worship; 1906–1911	Succeeded by Ernest Monis
Preceded by Edmond Guyot-Dessaigne	Minister of Justice; 1908–1909	Succeeded by Louis Barthou
Preceded by Georges Clemenceau	Prime Minister of France; 1909–1911	Succeeded by Ernest Monis
Preceded by Georges Clemenceau	Minister of the Interior; 1909–1911	Succeeded by Ernest Monis
Preceded by Jean Brun	interim Minister of War; 1911	Succeeded by Maurice Berteaux
Preceded by Jean Cruppi	Minister of Justice; 1912–1913	Succeeded by Louis Barthou
Preceded by Raymond Poincaré	Prime Minister of France; 1913	Succeeded by Louis Barthou
Preceded by Théodore Steeg	Minister of the Interior; 1913	Succeeded by Louis Lucien Klotz
Preceded by Jean-Baptiste Bienvenu-Martin	Minister of Justice; 1914–1915	Succeeded by René Viviani
Preceded by René Viviani	Prime Minister of France; 1915–1917	Succeeded by Alexandre Ribot
Preceded by René Viviani	Minister of Foreign Affairs; 1915–1917	Succeeded by Alexandre Ribot
Preceded by Georges Leygues	Prime Minister of France; 1921–1922	Succeeded by Raymond Poincaré
Preceded by Georges Leygues	Minister of Foreign Affairs; 1921–1922	Succeeded by Raymond Poincaré
Preceded by Paul Painlevé	Prime Minister of France; 1925–1926	Succeeded by Édouard Herriot
Preceded by Édouard Herriot	Minister of Foreign Affairs; 1925–1926	Succeeded by Édouard Herriot
Preceded by Édouard Herriot	Minister of Foreign Affairs; 1926–1932	Succeeded by Pierre Laval
Preceded by Raymond Poincaré	Prime Minister of France; 1929	Succeeded by André Tardieu
