= Painlevé =

Painlevé is a surname. Notable people with the surname include:

- Jean Painlevé (1902–1989), French film director, actor, translator, animator, son of Paul
- Paul Painlevé (1863–1933), French mathematician and politician, twice Prime Minister of France
  - Painlevé conjecture, a conjecture about singularities in the n-body problem by Paul Painlevé
  - Painlevé paradox, a paradox in rigid-body dynamics by Paul Painlevé
  - Painlevé transcendents, ordinary differential equation solutions discovered by Paul Painlevé

== Other ==
- French aircraft carrier Painlevé, a planned ship named in honor of Paul Painlevé
