= Abrami =

Abrami is a surname. Notable people with the surname include:

- Felice Abrami (1872–1919), Italian artist
- Lahcen Abrami (born 1969), Moroccan footballer
- Léon Abrami (1879–1939), French politician
- Patrick Abrami (fl. 2010), American politician
