= Jean Brun =

Jean Brun may refer to:

- Jean Brun (philosopher) (1919–1994), French philosopher
- Jean Brun (cyclist) (1926–1993), Swiss cyclist
- Jean Brun (general) (1849–1911), French general and politician
