= Gaston Ricci =

French politician

Gaston Ricci (11 February 1869 – 26 November 1952) was a French politician.

Ricci was born in Algiers, Algeria. He represented the Democratic and Social Action in the Chamber of Deputies from 1928 to 1932.
