= Durafour =

Durafour is a surname. Notable people with the surname include:

- Antoine Durafour (1876–1932), French politician
- Michel Durafour (1920–2017), French politician
