= Raymond Laquière =

French politician

- Born: August 10, 1881; Algiers, French Algeria
- Died: August 7, 1973 (aged 91); Saint-Martin-le-Vieil, Aude, France
- Occupations: Politician, lawyer
- Known for: Member of the French Third Republic's National Assembly

Raymond Laquière (August 10, 1881 – August 7, 1973) was a French politician who served as a deputy of French Algeria during the French Third Republic.

== Biography ==
Raymond Laquière was the son of General Laquière, who was an aide to Hubert Lyautey. He studied at the prestigious Lycée Bugeaud in Algiers before becoming a lawyer in the city. He later entered politics, serving as a general councillor and the mayor of Saint-Eugène, a suburb of Algiers.

Laquière was elected as a deputy of Algeria from 1928 to 1932, aligning with the Action démocratique et sociale parliamentary group. He later served in the Algerian Assembly from 1948 to 1954, where he was part of the liberal intergroup.

== Sources ==
- Biographical Dictionary of French Parliamentarians 1889–1940. National Assembly of France.
