= François Binet =

French politician (1880–1930)

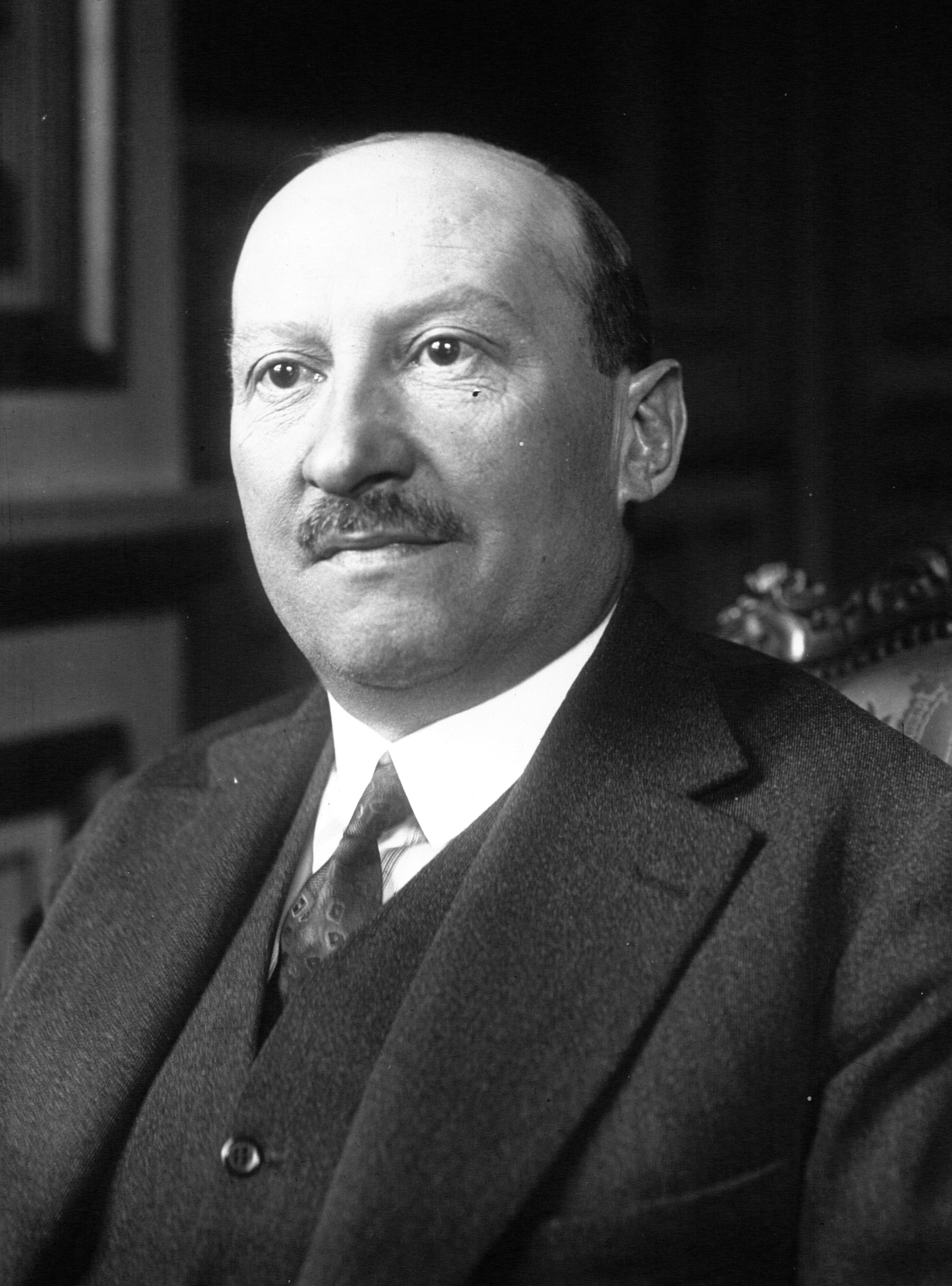
François Binet in 1926

François Binet (4 May 1880 – 2 December 1930) was a French politician. He served as Minister of Agriculture from April to July 1926 in Aristide Briand's ninth government.

He was a member of the Chambre des députés from 1908 to 1928.

== Biography ==
Binet was a French lawyer and politician affiliated with the Radical-Socialist Party. Born in Bonnat, Creuse, he earned a law degree and began his legal career at the Paris Court of Appeal before practicing at the Guéret bar. Binet entered politics as a district councilor in 1907 and was elected deputy for Creuse in a 1908 by-election. He served in the Chamber of Deputies from 1908 to 1914 and again from 1919 to 1928. During World War I, exempted from military service due to a hunting accident, he contributed to the war effort as Secretary-General of the Côte-d'Or Prefecture and undertook a mission to the United States in 1915 to study and monitor German propaganda. Appointed Minister of Agriculture in Aristide Briand's ninth government, he held the position from April to July 1926. After losing his parliamentary seat in 1928, Binet became mayor of Bonnat in 1929 and was elected senator for Creuse in January 1930. He died suddenly in Paris on 2 December 1930 at the age of 50.
