= Louis Barthou =

French politician (1862–1934)

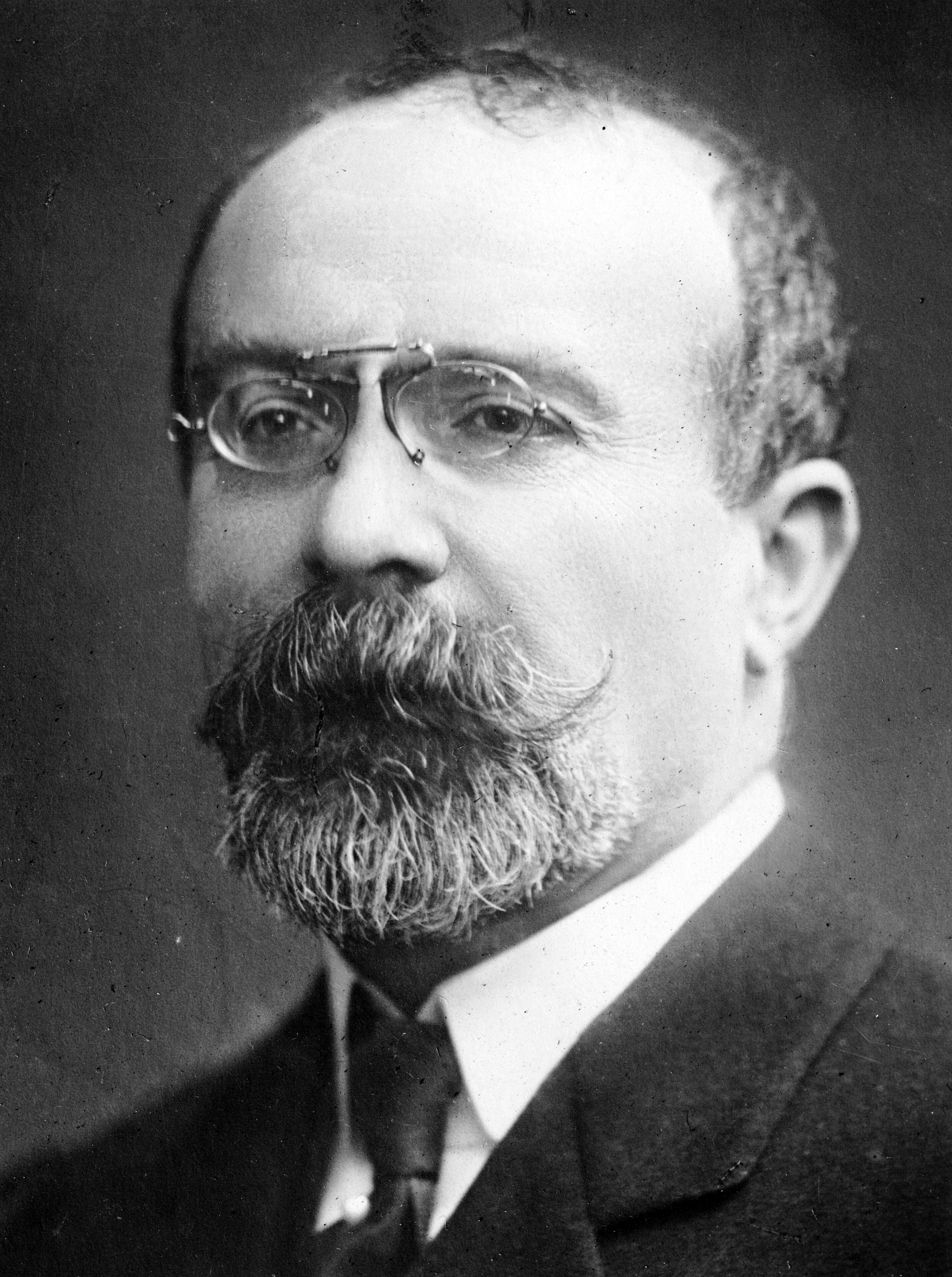

Minister of Foreign Affairs
- In office 9 February 1934 – 9 October 1934
- Prime Minister: Gaston Doumergue
- Preceded by: Édouard Daladier
- Succeeded by: Pierre Laval
- In office 23 October 1917 – 16 November 1917
- Prime Minister: Paul Painlevé
- Preceded by: Alexandre Ribot
- Succeeded by: Stephen Pichon

Prime Minister of France
- In office 22 March 1913 – 9 December 1913
- Preceded by: Aristide Briand
- Succeeded by: Gaston Doumergue

Personal details
- Born: Jean Louis Barthou; 25 August 1862 Oloron-Sainte-Marie, France
- Died: 9 October 1934 (aged 72) Marseille, France
- Cause of death: Gunshot wound
- Party: Democratic Republican Alliance
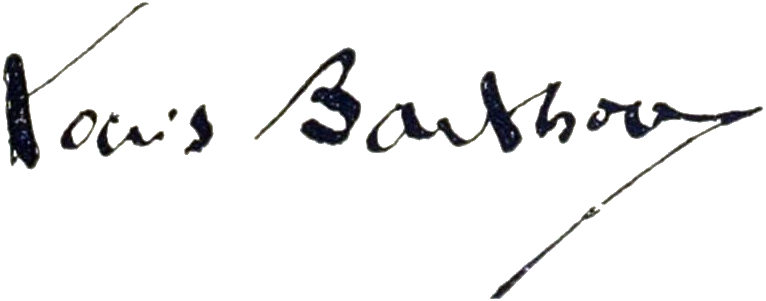
- Signature

Jean Louis Barthou (French: [ʒɑ̃ lwi baʁtu]; 25 August 1862 – 9 October 1934) was a French politician of the Third Republic who served as Prime Minister of France for eight months in 1913. In social policy, his time as prime minister saw the introduction (in July 1913) of allowances to families with children.

In 1917 and in 1934, Barthou also served as Minister of Foreign Affairs. He was accidentally killed by the French police amid the Croatian Ustaše's organised assassination of the King of Yugoslavia, Alexander, in Marseille, in 1934.

== Early life ==
Louis Barthou was born on 25 August 1862 in Oloron-Sainte-Marie, Pyrénées-Atlantiques, France.

== Career ==
Barthou served as a deputy from his home constituency and was an authority on trade-union history and law.

He served as prime minister from 22 March 1913 to 9 December 1913. In social policy, Barthou's time as prime minister saw the passage of a law in June 1913 aimed at safeguarding women workers before and after childbirth.

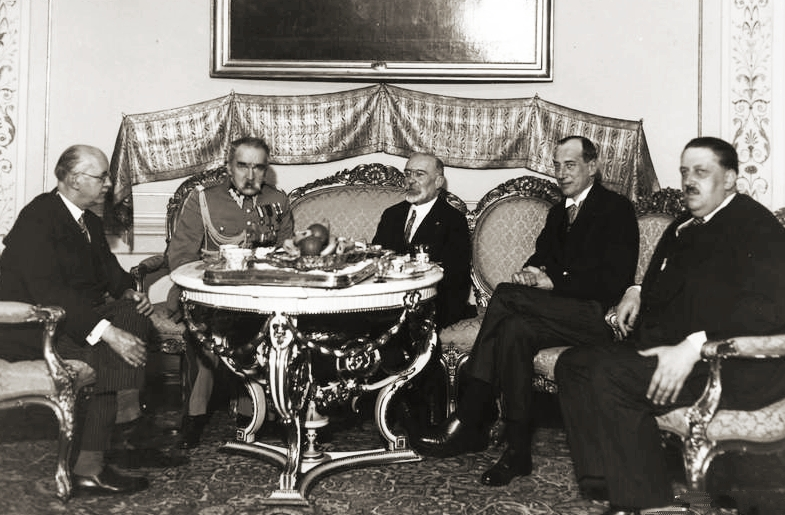
Barthou (right) with Polish marshal Józef Piłsudski in 1934

He also held ministerial office on 13 other occasions. He served as Foreign Minister in 1917 and 1934. He was the primary figure behind the Franco-Soviet Treaty of Mutual Assistance of 1935, but it was signed by his successor, Pierre Laval. As a national World War I hero and a recognized author, Barthou was elected to the Académie française at the end of that war.

In 1934, he tried to create an Eastern Pact, which would have included Germany (in some proposals) the Soviet Union, Poland, Czechoslovakia and the Baltic states on the basis of guarantees – of the European borders of the Soviet Union by France, and of the eastern borders of Nazi Germany by the Soviet Union. He succeeded in obtaining the entry of the Soviet Union into the League of Nations in September 1934. In response to the withdrawal of Nazi Germany from the League in 1933, he began a program of rearmament, which focused initially on the Navy and the Air Force.

Universal Newsreel's film about the assassination

Barthou was a lover of the arts, and in power he worked with leaders of the arts to publicize their fields. He felt that world-class leadership in the arts made Paris a mecca for tourists and collectors, and enhanced the nation's stature worldwide as the exemplar of truth and beauty. In turn, the arts community honoured Barthou by dubbing him the "minister of poets".

== Death ==
On 9 October 1934 King Alexander I of Yugoslavia landed at Marseille to begin a state visit to France; Barthou, as Foreign Minister, welcomed him on the quayside. On the same day King Alexander was assassinated by Vlado Chernozemski, a Bulgarian assassin wielding a handgun. Another bullet struck Barthou in the arm, passing through and fatally severing an artery. He died of blood loss less than an hour later. The assassination had been planned in Rome by Ante Pavelić, head of the Croatian Ustaše, in August 1934. Pavelić was assisted by Georg Percevic, a former Austro-Hungarian Armed Forces officer. France unsuccessfully requested the extradition of Percevic and Pavelić. This assassination ended the careers of the Bouches-du-Rhône prefect, Pierre Jouhannaud, and of the director of the Sûreté Nationale, Jean Berthoin.

A ballistic report on the bullets found in the car was made in 1935, but its results were not made available to the public until 1974; Barthou had been hit by an 8 mm Modèle 1892 revolver round, commonly used in weapons carried by French police, differing from one fitting the gun which hit the King. Thus Barthou's accidental killing was by a frantic police response, rather than by the assassin.

== Legacy ==
The deaths of Barthou and the King led to the Convention for the Prevention and Punishment of Terrorism concluded at Geneva by the League of Nations on 16 November 1937. The Convention was signed by 25 nations, ratified only by India. Barthou was granted a state funeral four days after his demise.

== Ministries ==
=== Barthou's ministry, 22 March 1913 – 9 December 1913 ===
- Louis Barthou – President of the Council and Minister of Public Instruction and Fine Arts
- Stéphen Pichon – Minister of Foreign Affairs
- Eugène Étienne – Minister of War
- Louis Lucien Klotz – Minister of the Interior
- Charles Dumont – Minister of Finance
- Henry Chéron – Minister of Labour and Social Security Provisions
- Antony Ratier – Minister of Justice
- Pierre Baudin – Minister of Marine
- Étienne Clémentel – Minister of Agriculture
- Jean Morel – Minister of Colonies
- Joseph Thierry – Minister of Public Works
- Alfred Massé – Minister of Commerce, Industry, Posts, and Telegraphs

Political offices
Preceded by Charles Jonnart	Minister of Public Works; 1894–1895	Succeeded by Ludovic Dupuy-Dutemps
Preceded by Ferdinand Sarrien	Minister of the Interior; 1896–1898	Succeeded by Henri Brisson
Preceded by Armand Gauthier de l'Aude (Public Works); Georges Trouillot (Posts & Telegraphs)	Minister of Public Works, Posts and Telegraphs; 1906–1909	Succeeded by Alexandre Millerand
Preceded by Aristide Briand	Minister of Justice; 1909–1910	Succeeded by Théodore Girard
Preceded by Aristide Briand	Minister of Justice; 1913	Succeeded by Antony Ratier
Preceded by Aristide Briand	President of the Council; 1913	Succeeded by Gaston Doumergue
Preceded by Théodore Steeg	Minister of Public Instruction; 1913	Succeeded by René Viviani
Preceded by –	Minister of State; 1917; With: Léon Bourgeois, Paul Doumer, Jean Dupuy	Succeeded by Léon Bourgeois; Paul Doumer; Jean Dupuy
Preceded by Alexandre Ribot	Minister of Foreign Affairs; 1917	Succeeded by Stéphen Pichon
Preceded by Flaminius Rabierti	Minister of War; 1921–1922	Succeeded by André Maginot
Preceded by Laurent Bonnevay	Minister of Justice; 1922	Succeeded by Maurice Colrat
Preceded by Maurice Colrat	Minister of Justice; 1926–1929	Succeeded by Lucien Hubert
Preceded by André Maginot	Minister of War; 1930–1931	Succeeded by André Maginot
Preceded by Édouard Daladier	Minister of Foreign Affairs; 1934	Succeeded by Pierre Laval
