= Eastern Pact =

European treaty proposal of the 1930s

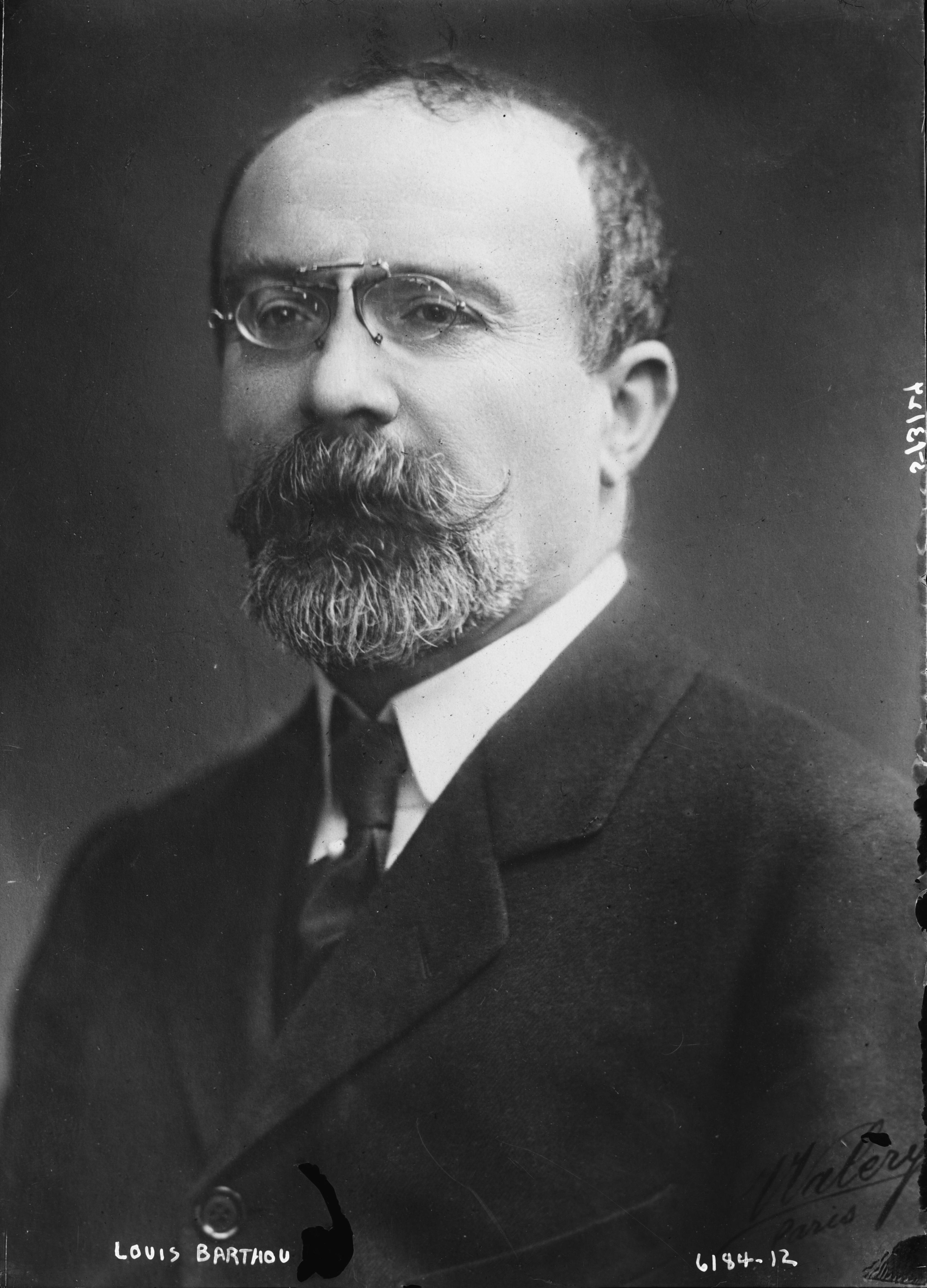
French Foreign Minister Louis Barthou

The Eastern Pact was a proposed mutual-aid treaty, intended to bring France, the Soviet Union, Czechoslovakia, Poland, Finland, Estonia, Latvia, and Lithuania together in opposition to Nazi Germany.

The idea of the Eastern Pact was advanced early in 1934 by the French minister of foreign affairs, Louis Barthou, and was actively supported by the Soviet government. In May and June 1934, the Soviet Union and France agreed to conclude a bilateral treaty providing for France's guaranteeing of the Eastern Pact and the guaranteeing of the Locarno Treaties of 1925 by the Soviet Union. On 14 June 1934 the Soviet government invited all interested states to participate in the Eastern Pact. Czechoslovakia (2 July), Latvia and Estonia (29 July), and Lithuania (3 August) declared their readiness to adhere to the pact. However, Estonia and Latvia made the adherence of Germany and Poland a condition of their own participation. The government of Finland avoided expressing its attitude toward the Eastern Pact. Barthou appealed to the British government in the name of the French government, but the British, while formally approving the idea of the Eastern Pact, made their support conditional on Germany's inclusion both in the regional mutual-aid treaty and in the Franco-Soviet Treaty so that Soviet and French guarantees would be extended to Germany. The Soviet and the French governments agreed, but the German government (11 September 1934) and subsequently the Polish government (27 September 1934) refused to participate in the Eastern Pact.

After Barthou was accidentally killed by French police during the arrest of Vlado Chernozemski on 9 October 1934, British and French diplomacy turned away from the Soviets and adopted the appeasement policy towards Germany. The proposed Eastern Pact was thus never implemented.

== See also ==
- Soviet–Finnish Non-Aggression Pact
- Soviet–Lithuanian Non-Aggression Pact
- Soviet–Polish Non-Aggression Pact
- Soviet–Estonian Non-Aggression Pact
- Franco-Soviet Treaty of Mutual Assistance
