= Felice Abrami =

Italian painter (1872–1919)

Felice Abrami (May 31, 1872 in Milan – August 7, 1919 in Abbiate Guazzone) was an Italian painter active in Milan, depicting mainly landscapes and genre subjects.

== Biography ==
He initially studied a classical education, but later enrolled in the Brera Academy where he studied under Filippo Carcano. In 1910, he participated in an exhibition at the Brera.
