= Jean Brun (general) =

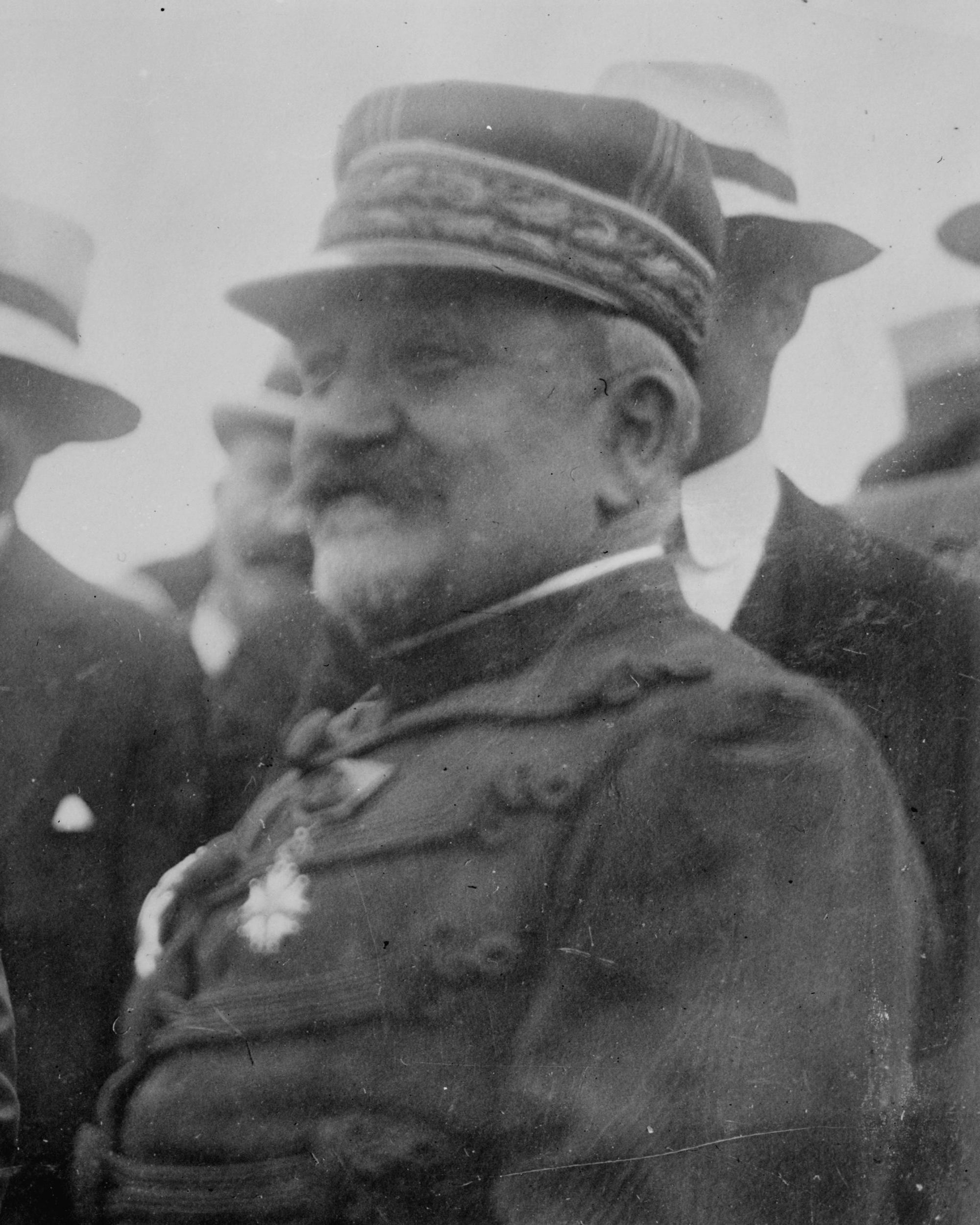

Jean Jules Brun (24 April 1849 – 23 February 1911) was a French Army general and politician. He served as Minister of War in Aristide Briand's first two governments from July 1909 until his death in 1911.

Born in Marmande, Lot-et-Garonne, Brun was the son of a baker. Brun entered the École Polytechnique in 1867 and joined the artillery branch of the French Army upon his graduation.

Brun was Chief of Staff of the French Army until entering politics as Aristride Briand's Minister of War in 1909, serving until his death in Paris two years later following an illness. During his tenure, he expanded military aviation.
