= Louis Antériou =

French politician

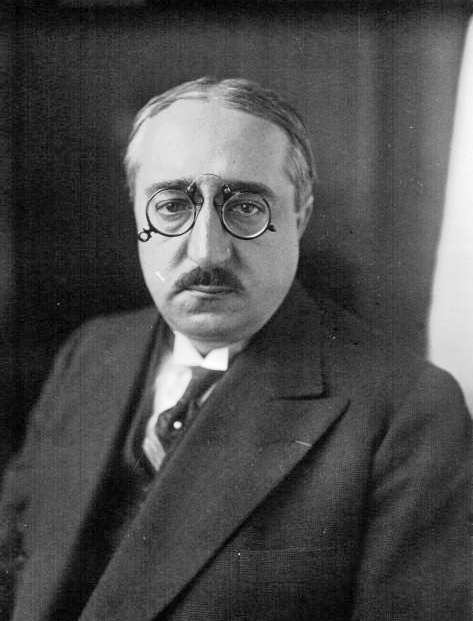
Louis Antériou

Louis Antériou (14 June 1887 – 5 March 1931) was a French politician.

Antériou was born in La Voulte-sur-Rhône. He represented the Republican-Socialist Party in the Chamber of Deputies from 1919 to 1931. He was a freemason.

Antériou was Minister of Pensions in 1925, in the administration of Paul Painlevé and continued in the role, under Raymond Poincaré, from 1928 to 1929.
