= Jean Brun (philosopher) =

French philosopher (1919–1994)

Jean Brun (March 13, 1919 – March 17, 1994) was a French philosopher who was a professor at the University of Dijon from 1961 to 1986.

== Life ==
Born into a Protestant family, Jean Brun obtained his aggregation in philosophy in 1946 and defended his thesis in 1961. A specialist in Aristotle and Greek philosophy, he has also written on Kierkegaard and Christian philosophy. A great popularizer of ancient philosophy and a prolific author, Brun was known as a Christian and conservative thinker.

He taught at the Protestant theology faculty of Aix-en-Provence founded in 1974, and collaborated on the journal Catholica from December 1991 until his death in 1994. He was awarded the Montyon Prize (by the French Academy) in 1974, the Maujean Prize in 1989 and the Biguet Prize in 1993.
