= Painlevé paradox =

Paradox from inconsistencies in friction models

In rigid-body dynamics, the Painlevé paradox (also called frictional paroxysms by Jean Jacques Moreau) is the paradox that results from inconsistencies between the contact and Coulomb models of friction. It is named for former French prime minister and mathematician Paul Painlevé.

To demonstrate the paradox, a hypothetical system is constructed where analysis of the system requires assuming the direction of the frictional force. Using that assumption, the system is solved. However, once the solution is obtained, the final direction of motion is determined to contradict the assumed direction of the friction force, leading to a paradox.

This result is due to a number of discontinuities in the behavior of rigid bodies and the discontinuities inherent in the Coulomb friction law, especially when dealing with large coefficients of friction. There exist, however, simple examples which prove that the Painlevé paradoxes can appear even for small, realistic friction.

== Explanations and solutions ==
Simplified models of friction applied to fully rigid bodies are extremely useful for a basic understanding of physical principles, or when modelling systems for applications such as animation, robotics and bio-mechanics. However, they are only an approximation to a full elastic model requiring complex systems of partial differential equations.

Several resolutions of the paradox have been published. A mathematical resolution was published in the 1990s by David E. Stewart. In the same decade, Franck Génot and Bernard Brogliato, published an explanation of the paradox from a more mechanical point of view, introducing the GB-points (or manifolds).

Génot and Brogliato have studied in great detail the rod dynamics in the neighborhood of a singular point of the phase space, when the rod is sliding. The dynamical equations are then a particular singular ordinary differential equation with vector field f(x)/g(x), where both f and g may vanish at a certain point (angle and angular velocity). One of the results is that at this singular point the contact force may grow unbounded, however its impulse remains always bounded (this may explain why time-stepping numerical methods like Moreau's scheme can well handle such situations since they estimate the impulse, not the force). Hence the infinite contact force is not at all an obstacle to the integration. Another situation (different from the first one) is that the trajectories may attain a zone in the phase space, where the linear complementarity problem (LCP) that gives the contact force, has no solution. Then the solution (i.e. the angular velocity of the rod) has to jump to an area where the LCP has a solution. This creates indeed a sort of "impact" with velocity discontinuity. Following the discovery of Genot and Brogliato, Hogan, Cheesman and their coworkers made an in-depth analysis of the Painleve paradox in dimension 3. They also provided detailed analyses of the regularized problem in the limit.

It is noteworthy that J. J. Moreau has shown in his seminal paper through numerical simulation with his time-stepping scheme (afterwards called Moreau's scheme) that Painlevé paradoxes can be simulated with suitable time-stepping methods, for the above reasons given later by Génot and Brogliato.

== Physical realizations ==
Walter Lewin drawing a dotted line with chalk, showing the bouncing effect

A common demonstration of the paradox is the "bouncing" of chalk when forced to slide across a blackboard. Since the Painlevé paradoxes are based on a mechanical model of Coulomb friction, where the calculated friction force can have multiple values when the contact point has no tangential velocity, this is a simplified model of contact. It does, nevertheless, encapsulate the main dynamical effects of friction, such as sticking and slipping zones. In addition to this simple example, more complex realizations of Painlevé paradoxes have been demonstrated.
