= Louis-Lucien Klotz =

French journalist and politician

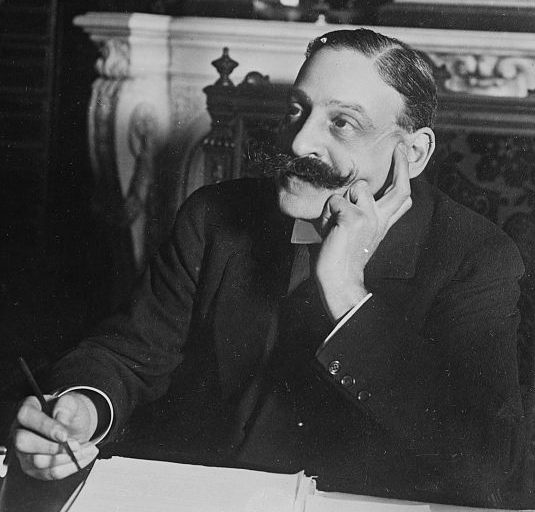
Louis-Lucien Klotz.

Louis-Lucien Klotz (11 January 1868 – 15 June 1930) was a French journalist and politician. He was the French Minister of Finance during World War I.

== Early life ==
Klotz was born in Paris to Alsatian Jewish parents. He was the nephew of Victor Klotz (1836–1906), a wealthy silk dealer. After completing his legal education, he enrolled as an advocate at the Cour d'Appel in Paris. In 1888, at the age of twenty, he founded Vie Franco-Russe, an illustrated paper intended to increase popular support for the Franco-Russian Alliance. In 1892 he became editor of Le Voltaire, and campaigned against the reactionary policy of Jules Ferry. In 1895, he founded Français Quotidien, a patriotic daily paper devoted to national defense, into which Voltaire was later merged.

== Political career ==
Klotz was an unsuccessful candidate for the National Assembly from his Paris district in the 1893 election. He ran for office and lost again a few years later. Then in the 1898 election, he ran for the Assembly from Montdidier as a Radical Socialist. This time, he was elected by an overwhelming majority. He retained this seat until 1925.

He was noted for his industry as a deputy and in government posts. He served as president of the Customs Commission, then as Rapporteur General of the budget. He held the following prominent ministerial posts:

- Minister of Finance, 3 November 1910 – 2 March 1911, in the second government of Aristide Briand. During this time he submitted a motion in favour of women's right to vote to the conseil général de la Somme. Drafted by Marie Denizard, it was adopted unanimously on 30 September 1910.
- Minister of Finance, 27 June 1911 – 22 March 1913, in Briand's third government.
- Minister of the Interior, 22 March-8 December 1913, in the government of Louis Barthou. At this time, there were large protests and demonstrations against the "Three Years Law" for military conscription.
- Minister of Finance, 12 September 1917 – 20 January 1920, in the second government of Georges Clemenceau. He was responsible for negotiating reparations from Germany. His policy was characterised by his famous formula: "The Boche will pay!" His efforts were motivated by his concerns over France's growing budget deficit and subsequent inflation.

== Personal life ==
In 1924, Klotz published his memoirs of this period, De La Guerre à La Paix (From the War to the Peace).

Klotz was a member of several civic and charitable societies, including the Society for the Defense of Children, the Prison Society and the Central Committee for Labour.

== Conviction and death ==
After his retirement, he became involved in dubious and risky financial speculations and lost all his money. In 1929, he was convicted of passing bad checks and sentenced to imprisonment for two years. He died less than a year later. With no further hope of settlement, his creditors seized his Paris residence at 9 Rue de Tilsitt, which he had inherited from his brother.

His lack of financial acumen was noted years earlier by Clemenceau, who reportedly commented "My finance minister is the only Jew in Europe who knows nothing about money."
