= Léon Abrami =

French politician

Léon Abrami (1 July 1879 – 5 January 1939) was a French politician.

Abrami was born in Istanbul, Ottoman Empire. He represented the Democratic Republican Alliance (from 1914 to 1924) and the Independent Radicals (from 1924 to 1928 and from 1932 to 1936) in the Chamber of Deputies.

He had a twin brother, Pierre Abrami, who was a physician.
