= Antoine Durafour =

French politician

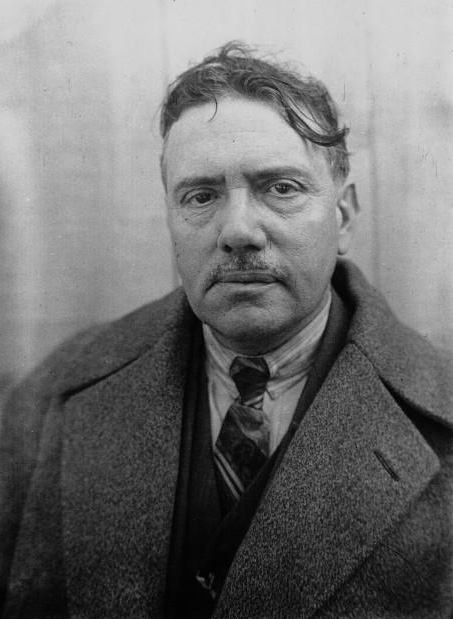
Durafour in 1929

Antoine Durafour (12 August 1876 in Saint-Étienne – 25 April 1932) was a French politician. He represented the Radical Party in the Chamber of Deputies from 1910 to 1932. From 1925 to 1926 he was Minister of Labour and Social Security provisions. From 1930 to 1932 he was mayor of Saint-Étienne.
