= Léon Perrier =

French politician

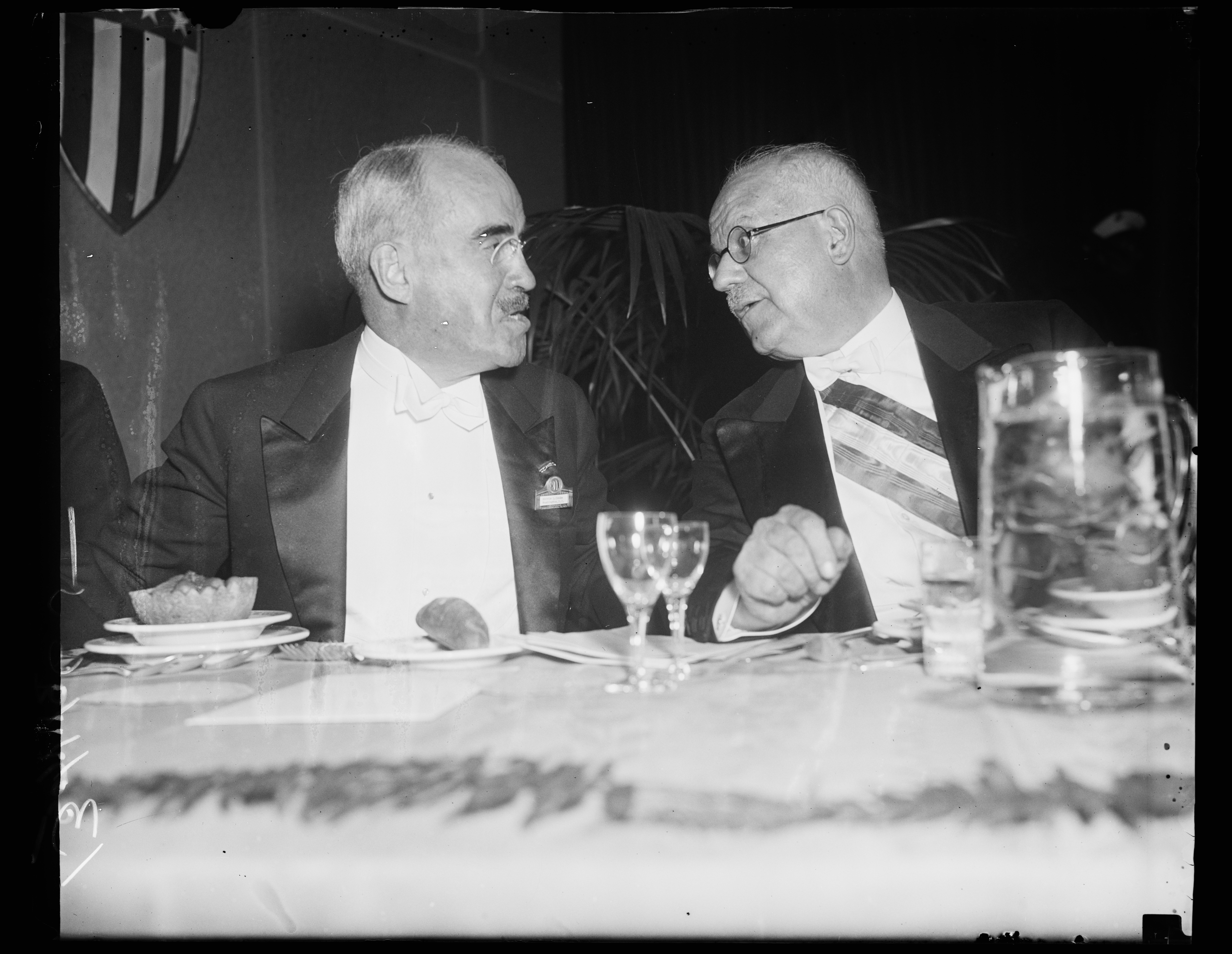
- Sen. Perrier, right, chats with REA chair Morris L. Cooke at a world power conference in Washington, D.C. (1936)
- Born: 1 February 1873; Tournon-sur-Rhône, Ardèche, France
- Died: 24 December 1948 (aged 75); Avignon, Vaucluse, France
- Occupation: Politician

Léon Perrier (1873–1948) was a French politician. He served as the French Minister of the Colonies from 1925 to 1928.

== Early life ==
Léon Perrier was born on 1 February 1873 in Tournon-sur-Rhône in the Ardèche, France.

== Career ==
Perrier served as a member of the Chamber of Deputies from 1910 to 1919. He went on to serve as a member of the Senate from 1920 to 1941. He represented Isère both times.

Perrier served as the Minister of the Colonies from 29 October 1925 to 19 July 1926 and from 23 July 1926 to 11 November 1928.

== Death ==
Perrier died on 24 December 1948 in Avignon, France.
