= Democratic and Social Action =

French parliamentary group in the Chamber of Deputies of France

The Democratic and Social Action (French: Action démocratique et sociale, ADS) was a French parliamentary group in the Chamber of Deputies of France during the French Third Republic between 1928 and 1932. The group was formed by the right-wing (bourgeois and industrialist wing according to André Siegfried) of the Democratic Republican Alliance, later Democratic Alliance. A number of ADS deputies were formerly members of the most left-wing faction of the Republican Federation, the main conservative party in France which they had left due to the Federation's evolution to the right.

The ADS was resurrected in 1949 by members of the Democratic and Socialist Union of the Resistance (UDSR) who joined the Gaullist Rally of the French People (RPF).

== See also ==
- Liberalism and radicalism in France
- Democratic Republican Alliance
- Republican Federation
- Sinistrisme
