= Battle of Les Éparges =

- Part of World War I and the Western Front
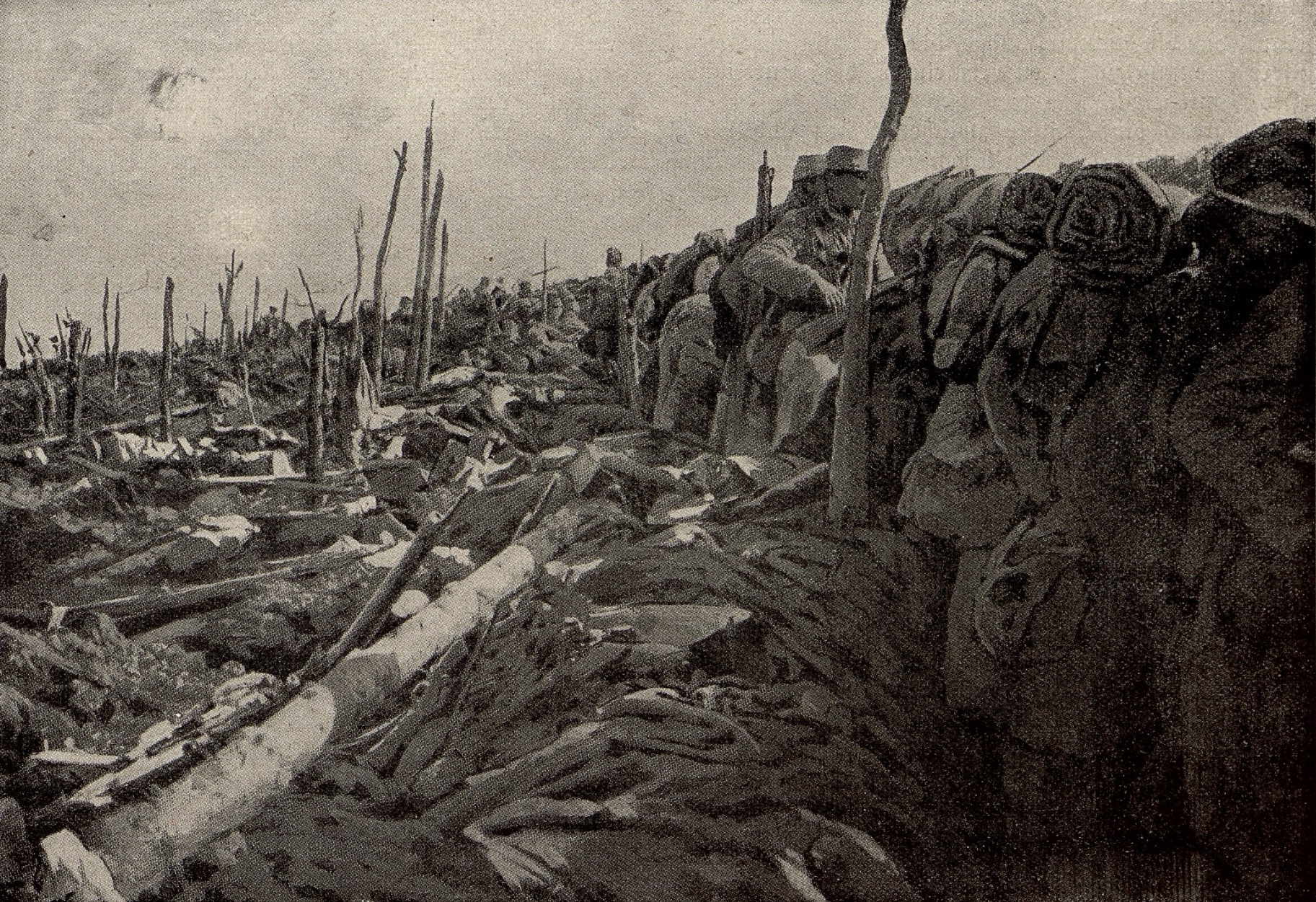
- French entrenchment at Les Éparges
Date	17 February – 9 April 1915
Location	Les Éparges, France 49°03′50″N 5°36′47″E
Result	French tactical victory

Belligerents
France	German Empire

Commanders and leaders
Marie Jean Auguste Paulinier; Frédéric-Georges Herr; Pierre Auguste Roques	Hermann von Strantz; Gustav von Oppen

Units involved
12th Infantry Division; 6th Army Corps; French First Army	33rd Reserve Division
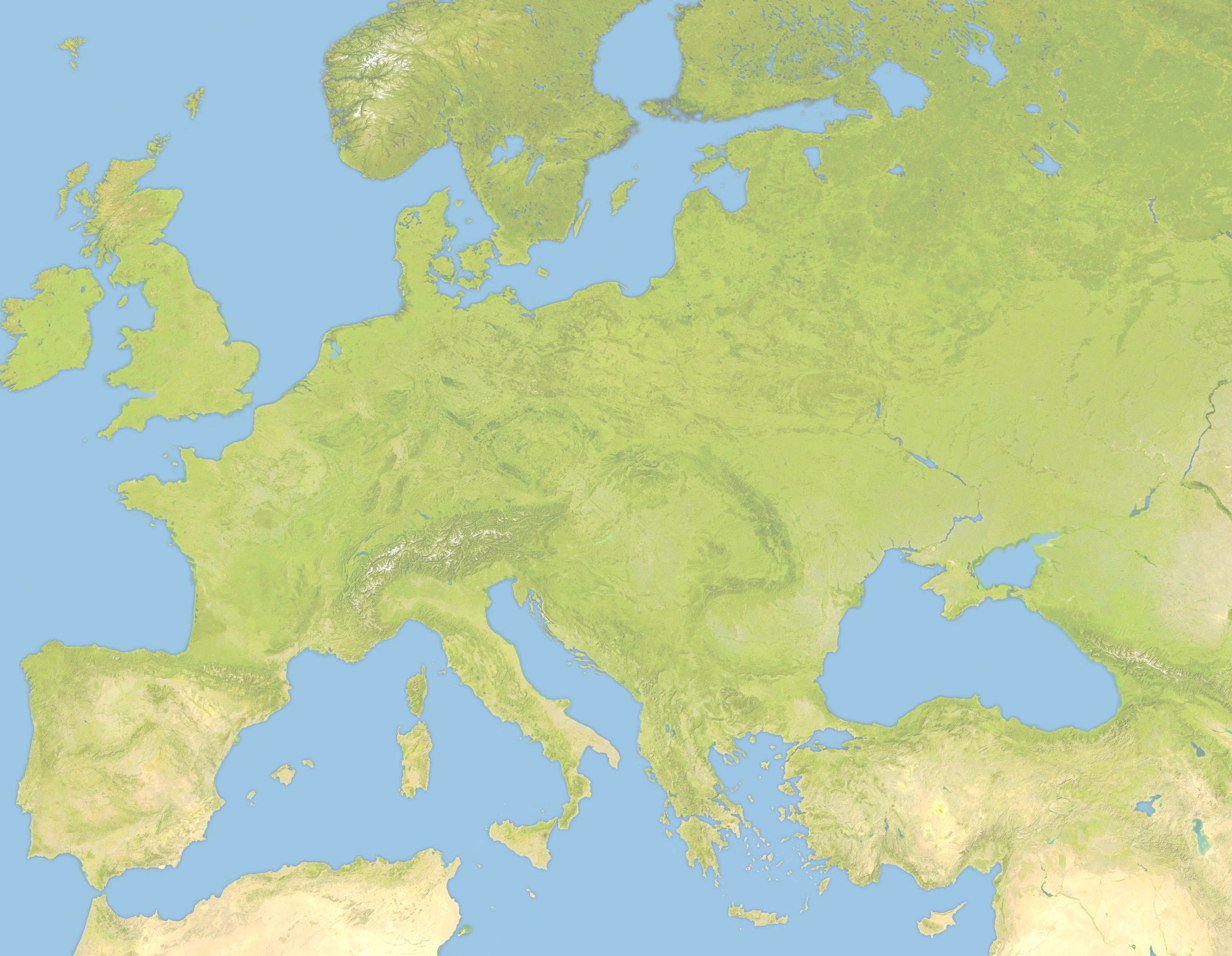
- Battlefield location in France Battlefield location in Europe

The Battle of Les Éparges, also known as the Battle of Combres in German accounts, was a series of engagements fought between French and German forces during the First World War. The fighting took place from 17 February to 9 April 1915 around the ridge east of Les Éparges in northeastern France, in the Meuse Heights.

The ridge was strategically important because of its commanding position over the Woëvre Plain. French forces sought to capture the high ground in order to establish an observation position for their artillery and reduce the Saint-Mihiel salient. The fighting became an important example of the prolonged trench warfare that characterized much of the Western Front.

== Background ==
Following the First Battle of the Marne in September 1914, German forces reached Saint-Mihiel and established a salient in the French front. The Éparges ridge occupied an important position on the northern side of this salient. The ridge, rising to approximately 346 metres (1,135 ft), overlooked the surrounding Woëvre Plain. Its position made it valuable as a natural observation point. In January 1915, the French high command planned an offensive in the Meuse Heights to obtain observation over the Woëvre Plain and monitor German movements and supply routes.

The French therefore decided to seize the ridge in order to reduce the Saint-Mihiel salient and establish an artillery observation position over the Woëvre Plain. French troops approached the German positions through a series of operations between November 1914 and January 1915, occupying the villages of Les Éparges and Saint-Remy-la-Calonne as well as positions north of the ridge. Engineers and infantry subsequently prepared trenches and approach works for the assault.

== Battle ==
=== February fighting ===
The main fighting began on 17 February 1915. The French launched an assault on the ridge after artillery preparation and the detonation of mines beneath German positions. The attack was carried out by French infantry including the 106th and 132nd Infantry Regiments, which initially gained ground on the ridge.

On 18 February, German forces counterattacked and recovered some of the lost ground. The French subsequently attacked again and regained positions on the ridge.

On 20 February, another French assault attempted to advance farther along the ridge. The fighting continued with repeated attacks and counterattacks, but the Germans retained important defensive positions farther east.

=== Fighting in March ===
After the February attacks, both sides strengthened their trench systems. The French launched another major assault in March, supported by heavy artillery. French troops gained additional ground but failed to capture the entire ridge, while the eastern position known as Point X remained contested.

Further French attacks followed during March. Despite considerable artillery support, the French were unable to achieve a decisive breakthrough. The fighting consisted of repeated attacks and counterattacks for limited territorial gains.

=== The April offensive ===
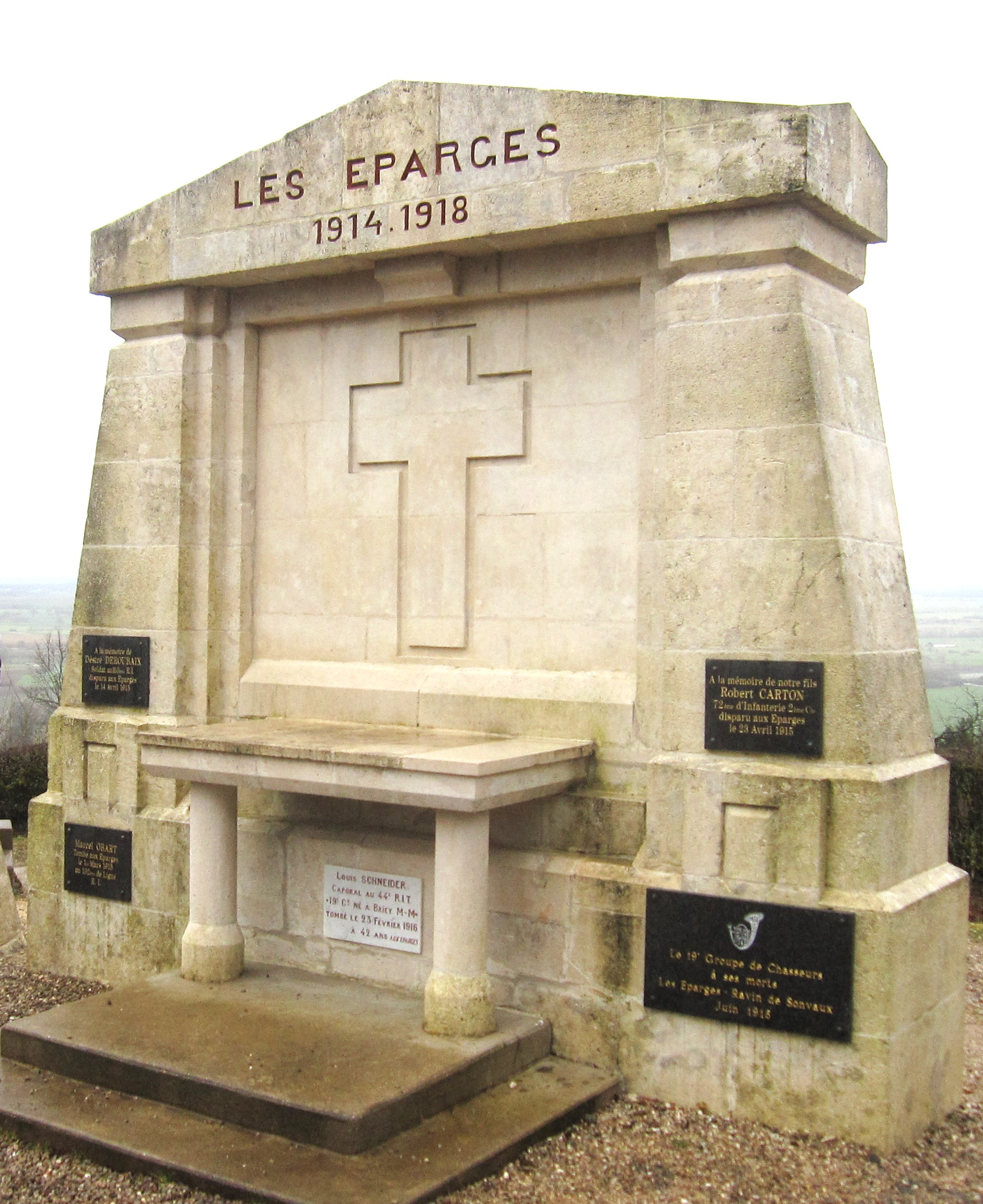
Monument at Point X at the top of the Éparges hill.

The final major phase of the battle took place in early April as part of the French offensive in the Woëvre region.

On 5 April, French troops attacked again as the French First Army launched its offensive in the Woëvre and Meuse Heights. Fighting continued over the following days, with French and German forces repeatedly attacking and counterattacking around the ridge.

On 9 April, the French artillery heavily bombarded the ridge. French troops from the 106th Infantry Regiment and the 25th Chasseurs Alpins, supported by the 132nd Infantry Regiment, captured Point C and the main ridge line. The 8th Infantry Regiment attacked Point X, but the Germans retained Point X and the southern slope of the hill.

Although the French held most of the ridge, they had not captured Point X and therefore could not fully achieve their objective of controlling the entire position.

== Conditions and casualties ==
The fighting at Les Éparges took place under exceptionally difficult conditions. Rain, mud, artillery bombardment and the destruction caused by repeated fighting made the ridge one of the most difficult sectors of the Meuse Heights.

The battle was characterized by repeated attacks and counterattacks in which large numbers of soldiers were committed for relatively small territorial gains. Contemporary summaries give very heavy losses on both sides; one account estimates approximately 12,000 killed, wounded and missing during the principal fighting in 1915. The French Ministry of Armed Forces gives a broader figure of approximately 10,000 French killed or missing, with German losses described as comparable, when considering the wider fighting in the sector.

The French ultimately held most of the Éparges ridge, but the Germans retained important positions, particularly Point X.

== Mine warfare ==
The fighting at Les Éparges did not end with the main infantry assaults. The area subsequently became an important centre of mine warfare. Both French and German engineers dug tunnels beneath the opposing trenches and placed explosives under enemy positions.

The mine war continued until 1917. In total, 46 German and 32 French mines were exploded along a front of approximately 800 metres (2,600 ft). The explosions created numerous large craters and permanently altered the appearance of the battlefield. Despite the destruction caused by the mines, the explosions produced no significant territorial gain.

== Significance ==
The Battle of Les Éparges was an important example of the developing nature of trench warfare on the Western Front. Instead of a single decisive clash, the fighting consisted of successive assaults, bombardments, counterattacks and periods of consolidation. The ridge remained an active sector of the Western Front, with fighting and mine warfare continuing after the principal operations of February–April 1915.

The fighting at Les Éparges also foreshadowed the violence of later battles in the Verdun sector. The French Ministry of Armed Forces describes the fighting as a particularly brutal series of engagements that prefigured the intensity of later offensives at Verdun and on the Somme.

== Notable participants ==
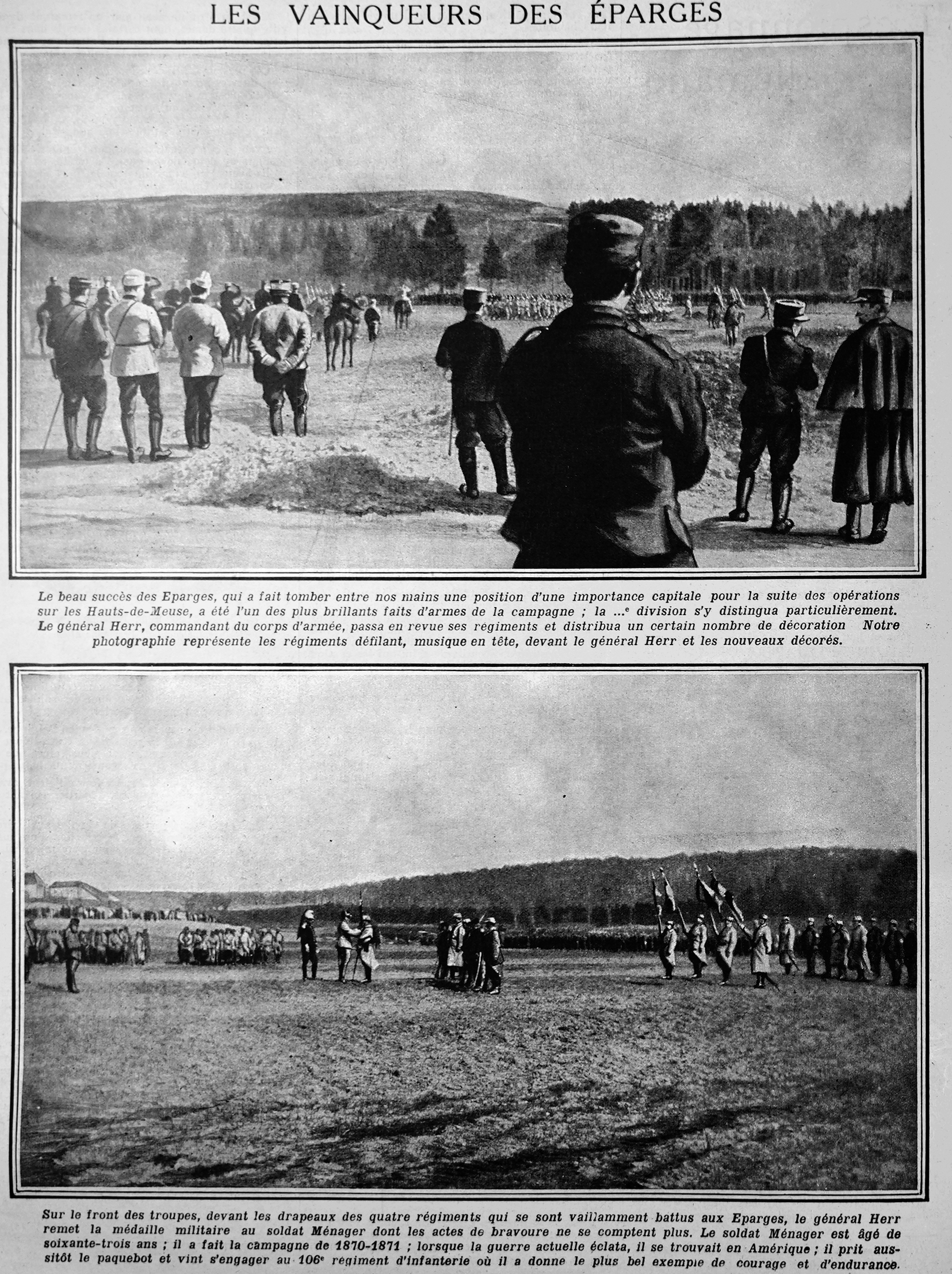
Units decorated by General Frédéric-Georges Herr, May 1915

Several notable French and German figures took part in the fighting.

- The French writer Maurice Genevoix, then a second lieutenant in the 106th Infantry Regiment, fought at Les Éparges. He spent several months in the sector before being wounded on 25 April 1915 at the Tranchée de Calonne.
- Robert Porchon, a French officer and friend of Genevoix, was killed during the fighting at Les Éparges in February 1915.
- The French politician Frédéric Chevillon, mayor of Allauch and a member of the French Chamber of Deputies, was killed in action near Les Éparges in February 1915.
- The sculptor Georges Saupique was wounded during the fighting on 18 March 1915.
- Eugène Lemercier, painter and sergeant in the 106th Infantry Regiment, was reported missing during the April fighting.
- The writer Louis Pergaud, best known for War of the Buttons, fought in the Meuse offensive and was declared dead on 8 April 1915 after disappearing during the fighting near Fresnes-en-Woëvre.
- The Jesuit theologian Pierre Rousselot died in April 1915.
- Maurice Bedel, a doctor and writer, served during the fighting.
- The composer and conductor Albert Wolff served with a field stretcher-bearer unit and witnessed the fighting at Les Éparges in spring 1915.
- On the German side, the future writer Ernst Jünger participated in the fighting and was wounded. He later described his experiences of the First World War in Storm of Steel.

== Legacy ==
Les Éparges became an important site of remembrance after the war. The ridge, with its trenches, mine craters and memorials, remains closely associated with the soldiers who fought and died there. The site contains monuments and memorials including those at Point X, Point C and the national necropolis at Le Trottoir.

The Éparges ridge remains one of the significant surviving landscapes of the First World War. Its heavily cratered terrain provides a visible reminder of the destructive nature of trench and mine warfare on the Western Front.
