= Chevillon =

Chevillon may refer to:

== Communes in France ==
- Chevillon, Haute-Marne
- Chevillon, Yonne
- Chevillon-sur-Huillard, Loiret

== People ==
- Bruno Chevillon (born 1959), French jazz double bassist
- Constant Chevillon (1880–1944), French occultist
- Frédéric Chevillon (1879–1915), French politician
- Joseph Chevillon (1849–1910), French physician and politician
