= Hôtel de Ville, Allauch =

Town hall in Allauch, France

Hôtel de Ville
- The main frontage of the Hôtel de Ville in the early 20th century
- Interactive map of the Hôtel de Ville area

General information
- Type: City hall
- Architectural style: Neoclassical style
- Location: Allauch, France
- Coordinates: 43.3362°N 5.4823°E
- Completed: c.1821

The Hôtel de Ville (French pronunciation: [otɛl də vil], City Hall) is a municipal building in Allauch, Bouches-du-Rhône, in southeastern France, standing on Place Docteur Joseph Chevillon.

== History ==
The building was commissioned by the canons of the Marseille Cathedral, who served as the local seigneurs under the ancien régime, in the 18th century. During the French Revolution, the canons were deprived of their right to administer the town and their palace was seized by the state: it was then acquired by the new town council in 1792. It was partially demolished in 1815 and then remodelled, so that the main frontage was in line with that of the Church of Saint-Sebastian, in 1821. The design involved a symmetrical main frontage of three bays facing onto the square. The central bay featured a square-headed doorway, while the building was fenestrated by casement windows with shutters on three floors and, at roof level, there was a pediment with a coat of arms in the tympanum. A porch, formed by a pair of Doric order columns supporting an entablature and a balustraded balcony, was designed by Fernand Rambert and installed in 1909.

A monument to commemorate the life of the former mayor, Joseph Chevillon, was created by the sculptor, Henri Raybaud, and unveiled in front of the town hall by the minister for agriculture, Étienne Clémentel, on 25 May 1913. It was later melted down on the orders of the Vichy Regime during the Second World War.

In December 2002, the council relocated to a more modern three-storey building on the west side of Place Pierre Bellot. Weddings were subsequently held in the ornate surroundings of the Salle de Mariages (wedding room) in the Bastide de Fontvieille on Route des Quatre Saisons on the southeastern outskirts of the town. Meanwhile, the old town hall was converted to serve as the museum displaying a collection of local history and sacred art. The museum also incorporated an exhibition commemorating the work of the author, Marcel Pagnol, who lived in the area.

The museum closed in March 2022 to allow the building to be refurbished and restored to its former status as the town hall of Allurch. The building was officially re-opened by the mayor, Lionel de Cala, on 22 June 2024. Meanwhile the Pagnol collection was placed in storage ready to be moved to a new location in a former power plant on Avenue du Général de Gaulle on the northeastern outskirts of the town.
