= General Herr =

General Herr may refer to:

- Frédéric-Georges Herr (1855–1932), French Army general of division
- John Knowles Herr (1878–1955), U.S. Army major general
- Traugott Herr (1890–1976), German Wehrmacht general
