= Frédéric Chevillon =

French politician (1879–1915)

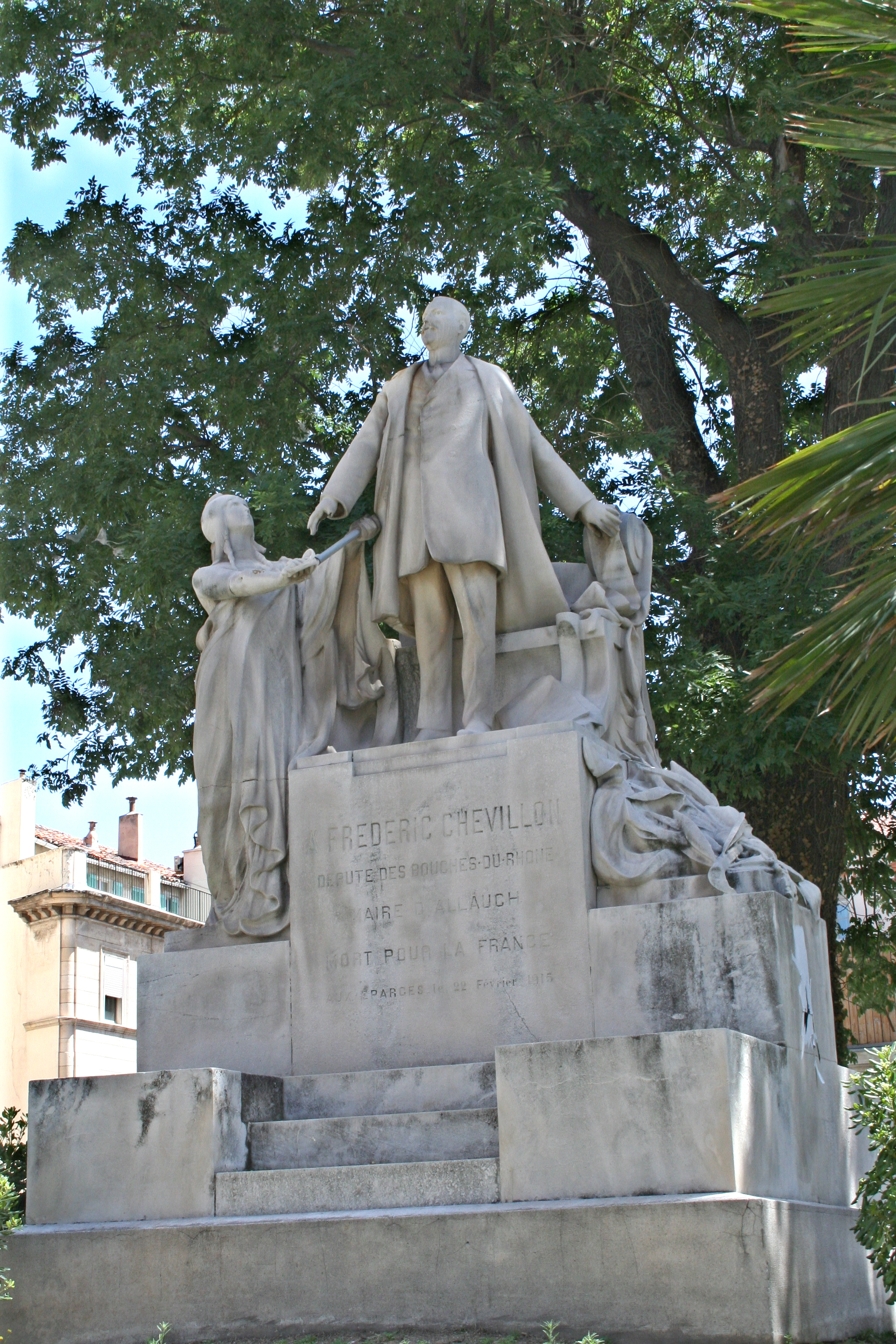
- Statue designed by Henri Raybaud dedicated on the Place de la corderie-Henri Bergasse in Allauch in 1917.
- Born: 12 January 1879; Marseille, Bouches-du-Rhône, Provence-Alpes-Côte d'Azur, France
- Died: 21 February 1915 (aged 36); Les Éparges, Meuse, Lorraine, France
- Cause of death: Killed in action
- Occupation: Politician
- Parent: Joseph Chevillon

Frédéric Chevillon (12 January 1879 – 21 February 1915) was a French politician.

== Early life ==
Chevillon was born on 12 January 1879 in Marseille, France. His father, Joseph Chevillon, was a politician.

== Career ==
He served as a member of the Chamber of Deputies from 1912 to 1915. He was mayor of Allauch from 1910.

== Death ==
He died on 21 February 1915 in Les Éparges, France.

== Legacy ==
His statue, designed by Henri Raybaud, was dedicated on the Place de la corderie-Henri Bergasse in Marseille in 1917.
