= Château de Ners =

Ruined castle in Provence-Alpes-Côte d'Azur, France

Coordinates: 43°22′05″N 5°31′35″E

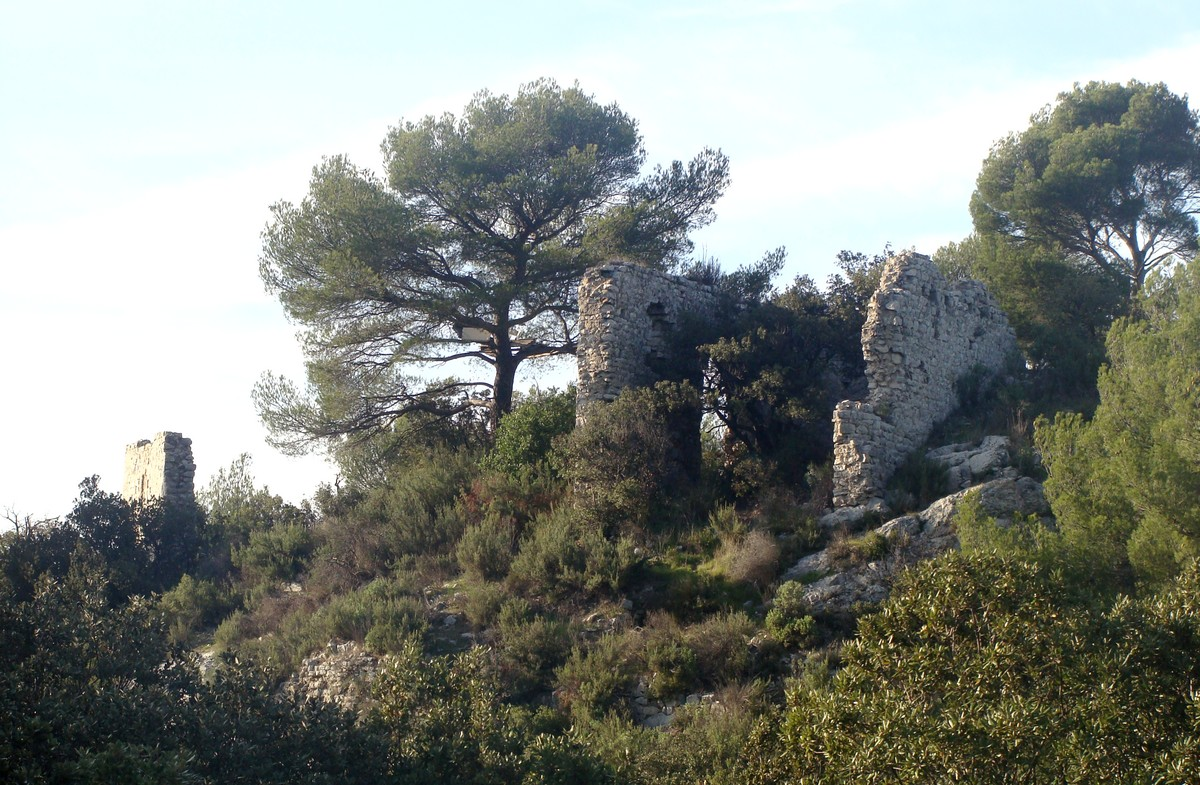
Château de Ners

The Château de Ners is a ruined castle standing on a hill dominating the valley of the Pichauris. It is located north east of the town of Allauch in the commune of Allauch in the Bouches-du-Rhône département of France.

== History ==
The double curtain wall of the enceinte was constructed at the beginning of the 12th century by Raimond I, Bishop of Marseille, to protect his right to levy tolls. All that remains today are ruins.

The castle is also known under the name of Castèu-Vièi (literally "old castle" in Provençal), and also as Château de la Reine Jeanne - Castle of Queen Jeanne (Joan I of Naples) - though there is no documentary record to confirm that it was ever in her possession or that she could have come to live there; however, the legend holds on.

== Architecture ==
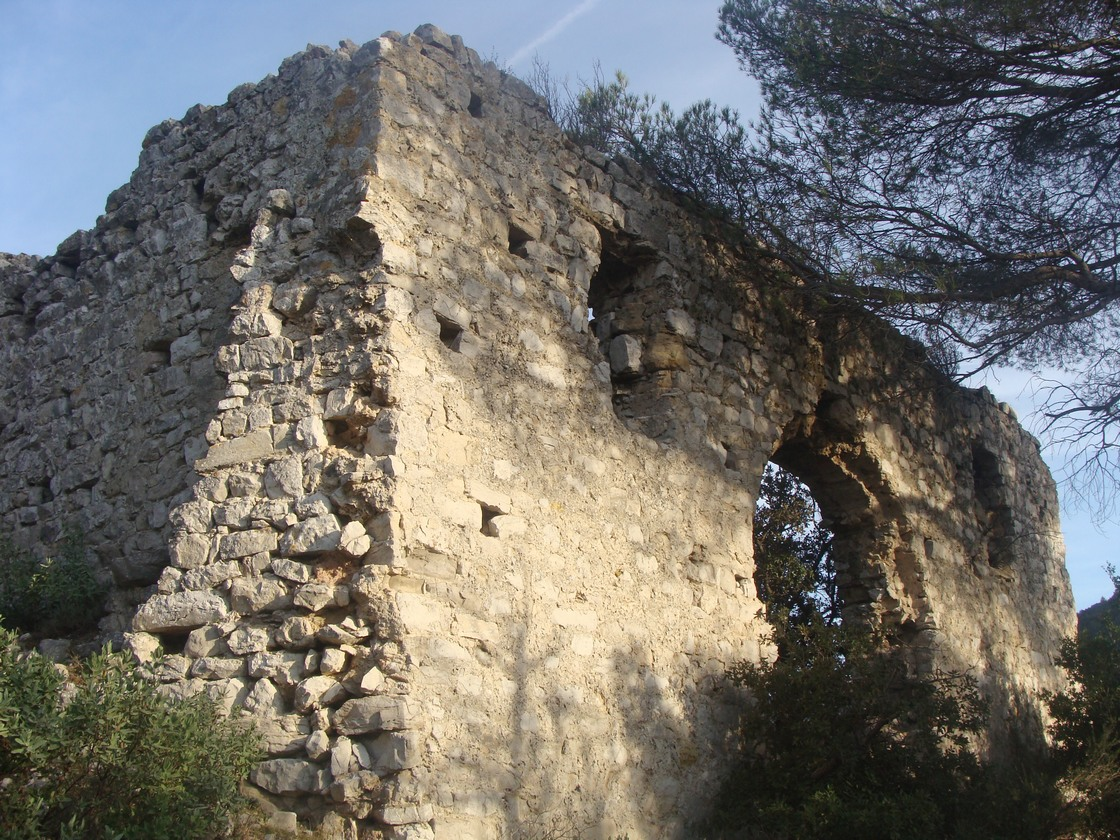
One of the buildings at Château de Ners, current state

A detailed description by Saurel of the ruins around 1877 appears in volume two of Dictionnaire des Bouches-du-Rhône. On a small hill surrounded by the stream of the Jarret there remain the remnants of two square towers with thick walls. One of the towers has two floors; an arched door to the lower floor opens into a vaulted room 6 metres by 2.75 metres (the detritus on the ground was 2.5 metres thick in 1877), with above the vestiges of an identical room whose side wall was totally missing. This part had possibly been joined to the rest of the castle. A small window opens out above the entrance; this bay measures 0.9 m by 0.5 m externally and 0.6 by .01 internally. The east wall is pierced by a large opening.

Within the enceinte formed by the ramparts linking the two towers which defended the north east and south west, are three walls of 4 to 5 metres in height which formed the three sides of an edifice which seemed to have been a church. This church was dedicated to Saint Stephen and would have had baptismal fonts, which helps to explain the importance of the site at the time, given that towards the east are the ruins of a wall, about 50 metres long, onto which lean the remains of what would have been numerous dwellings.

The Notre-Dame de Beauvois Chapel and the remains of the castle have been listed since 28 December 1984 as a monument historique by the French Ministry of Culture.

== See also ==
- List of castles in France

== Sources ==
- Text by Madame Combaluzier in the bulletin Allauch historique n°2, online at Allauch Tourist Office (in French)
