= Harriet Osborne O'Hagan =

Irish portrait artist

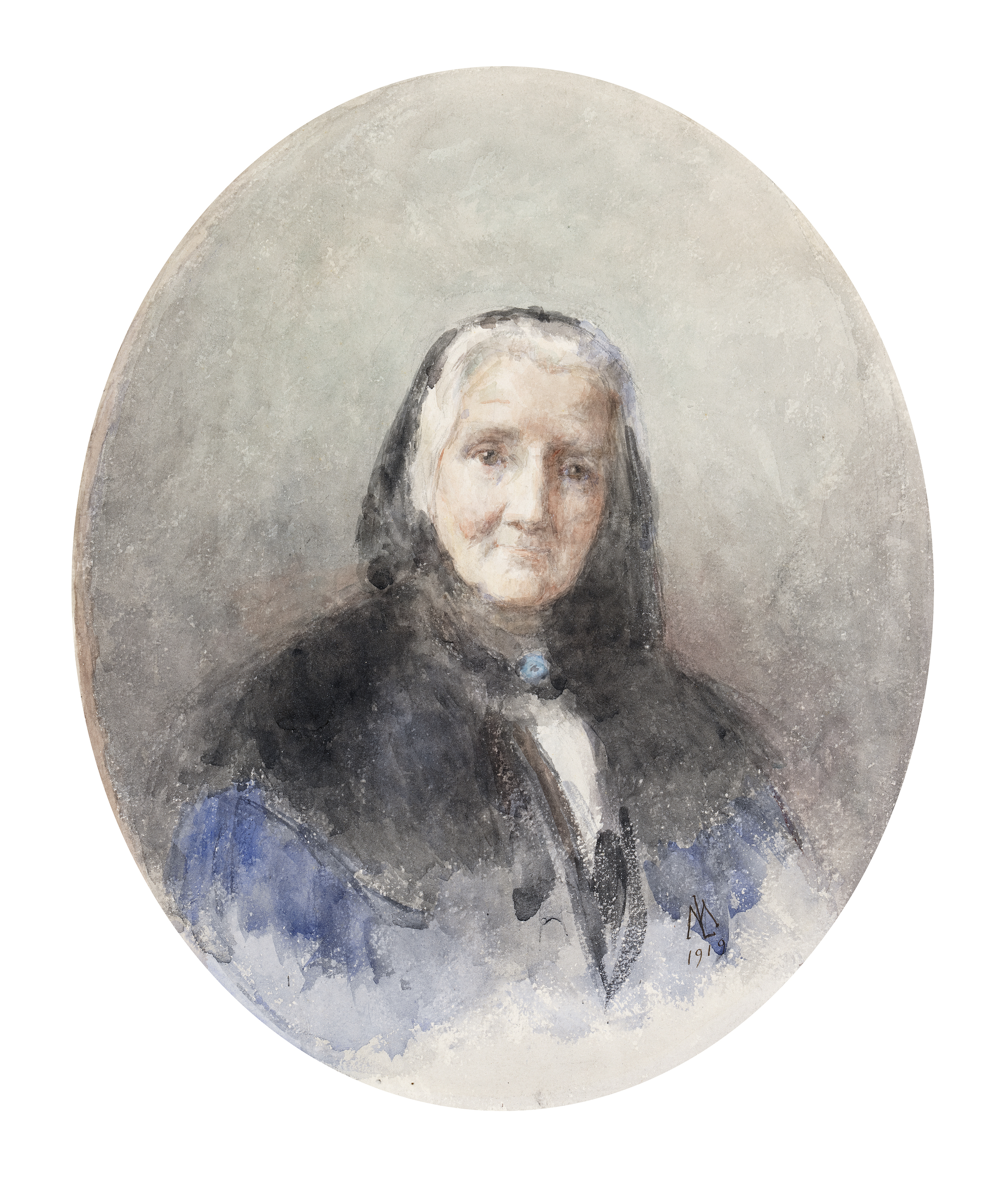
- Born: Harriet Osborne; 1830; Dublin, Ireland
- Died: 1921 (aged 91); Paris, France

Harriet Osborne O'Hagan (1830–1921) was an Irish portrait artist.

== Life ==
Harriet Osborne was born in Dublin in 1830. She initially studied with George Sharp RHA. At least one Dublin address can be discerned from her exhibited works, 195 Great Brunswick Street. Having moved to London, she appears under the name O'Hagan in 1854 living at 193 Stanhope Street, though it is unknown when or where she married. Around 1866, O'Hagan moved to Paris. She was in Paris at the same time as Sarah Purser, and was a member of her social circle, however little is known about her personal life or career. Purser produced portrait entitled Mademoiselle Lemercier in 1887, which is likely to be O'Hagan's daughter, Marguerite Lemercier O'Hagan (1859 – c.1930). It has been suggested that this portrait was created during a visit to Ireland. O'Hagan lived out her life in France, and it is known that she lamented being unable to return to Ireland. She died in 1921, in Paris. Her grandson was Eugène Lemercier, son of her daughter Marguerite, who were both artists in their own right. Lemercier's wartime correspondence is now in the collections of the National Library of Ireland.

She was buried in Montmartre Cemetery, 6th Division, along the wall, in the center of the division, with her daughter Eugenie-Anna (1863-1972), and her son Maximilian (1856-1881).

== Artistic career ==
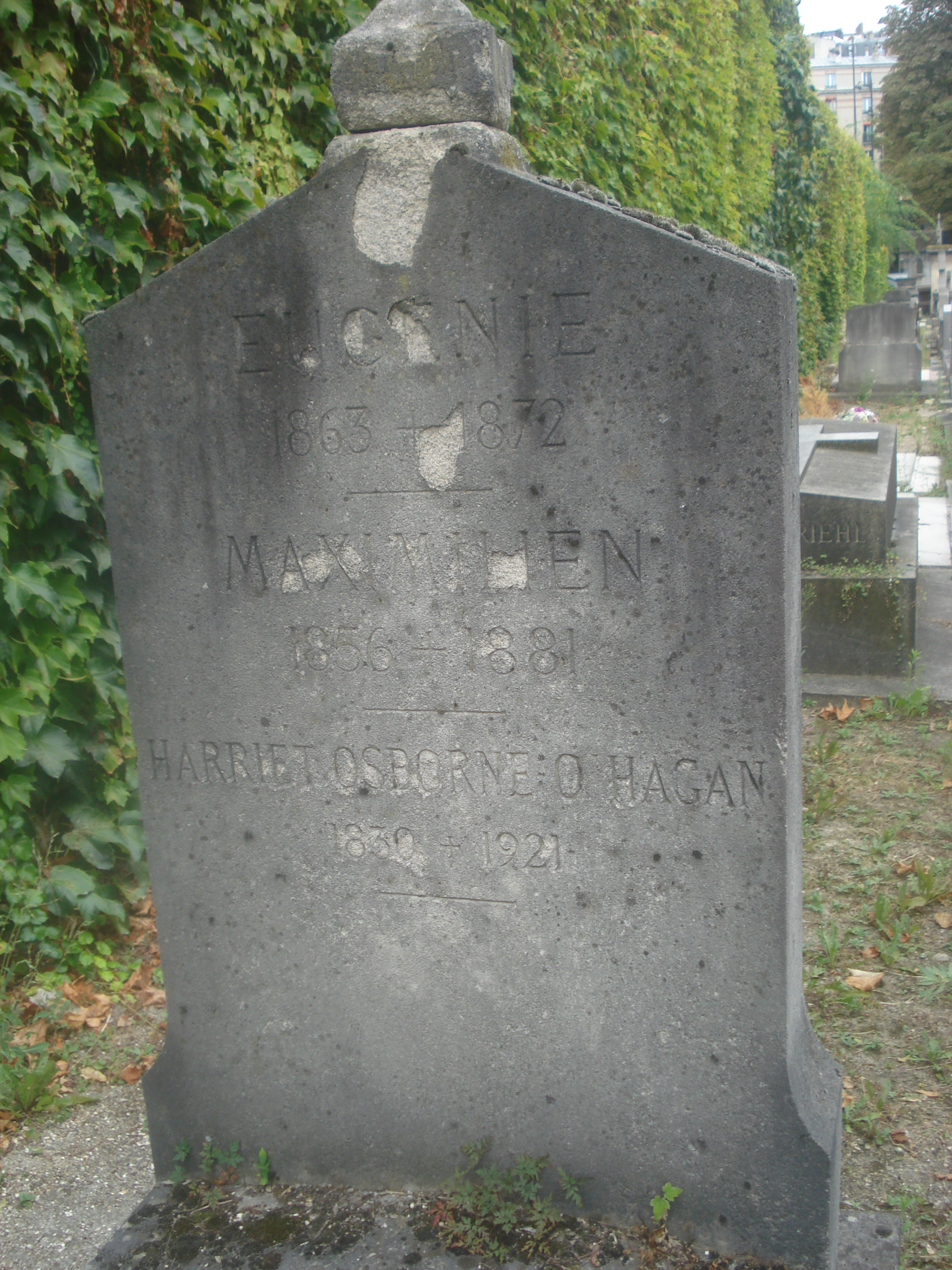
The grave of Harriet Osborne O'Hagan, Montmartre Cemetery, 6th division

The first appearance of O'Hagan exhibiting, under Osborne, was at age nineteen with a lithograph of Mrs Hone after Mr Burton with the Royal Hibernian Academy in 1849. In 1851, she submitted four portraits, one in chalk and a watercolour of Richard D'Alton Williams. Encouraged by Sharp to study abroad, O'Hagan lived in London for a time, exhibiting under the name O'Hagan with the Royal Academy of Arts in 1854. Having moved to Paris in 1866, she studied with Thomas Couture, Léon Cogniet, and Joseph-Nicolas Robert-Fleury. O'Hagan taught classes, with some suggestion that she opened her own academy for women. Between 1866 and 1876, she showed largely portraits at salon exhibitions. One such work was a portrait of her daughter, entitled Marguerite s'amuse.

In 1948, M. Garbaye and J. de L'Etre of Savigny-sur-Oise, France presented the National Gallery of Ireland (NGI) with two oil paintings and four charcoal drawings by O'Hagan. Three of the drawings are portraits, with one undated drawing believed to be her sister Eugénie, and the other two her daughter Marguerite. The final charcoal drawing is entitled Farm in Normandy (1880). The oil paintings are Maximilian O'Hagan and An Interior respectively. One painting, An Interior, was featured in the NGI's 1984 exhibition, The Irish Impressionists, Irish Artists in France and Belgium, 1850-1914.
