= 16th Army Corps (France) =

French Army corps active from 1870 to 1940

16e Corps de Armée
- Active: 1870–1940
- Country: France
- Type: Army Corps
- Engagements: World War II

Commanders
- Notable commanders: Antoine Chanzy; Paul François Grossetti

The French 16th Army Corps was a French military unit created in November 1870 by the vice admiral Fourichon, which fought in the Franco-Prussian War, the First and Second World War.

== History ==
=== World War Two ===
In June 1940, the French 16th Army Corps, led by Général Fagalde, was deployed in Normandy and Brittany to defend the Dives and Orne rivers.

== Commanders ==
=== Franco-Prussian War ===
- 13 October 1870 : Général d'Aurelle de Paladines
- 17 October 1870 : Général Pourcet d'Arnéguy
- 2 November 1870 : Général Chanzy
- 5 December 1870 : Amiral Jauréguiberry

=== World War I ===
- 30 October 1913 : Général Taverna
- 7 November 1914 : Général Grossetti
- 13 January 1917 : Général Herr
- 30 April 1917 : Général Corvisart
- 26 August 1918 : Général Deville

=== World War II ===
- 1939 – 1940 : Général Fagalde

== Sources ==
- Fagalde (1952-10-01). "L'agonie d'un corps d'armée : le 16e corps d'armée français en Normandie et Bretagne (juin 1940) [suite]". Revue Militaire Suisse. doi:10.5169/SEALS-348509.
