= Eugène Lemercier =

French artist and soldier

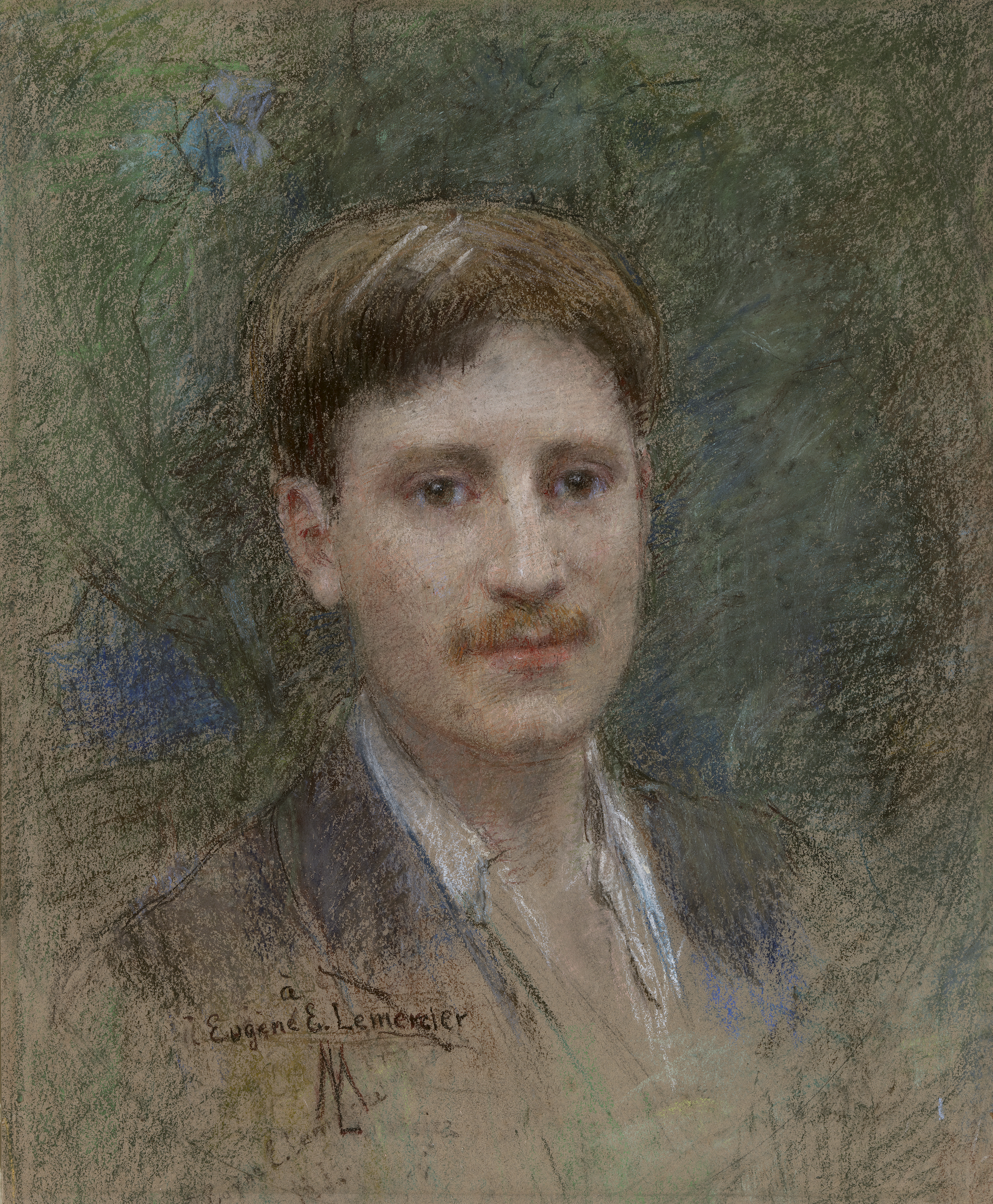
- Born: Eugène Emmanuel Lemercier; 7 November 1886; Paris, France
- Died: 6 April 1915 (aged 28); Les Éparges
- Relatives: Harriet Osborne O'Hagan
- Military career
- Allegiance: France
- Branch: French Army
- Service years: 1906, 1914-1915

Eugène Lemercier (7 November 1886 – 6 April 1915) was a French artist and soldier in World War I. His letters to his mother are a first-hand account of the war, and are preserved in the National Library of Ireland. He is believed to be the subject of Wallace Stevens' poem "The Death of a Soldier."

== Early life and artistic career ==
Eugène Emmanuel Lemercier was born in Paris on 7 November 1886. He was the son of Marguerite O’Hagan and Eugène-Augustin Lemercier. His grandmother was the Irish portrait artist Harriet Osborne O'Hagan, and his mother was also an artist. His father died before Lemercier was born. Lemercier entered the École des Beaux-Arts at age fifteen. He left the École in 1906 to join the army to complete his military service. Lemercier won a number of government prizes for his paintings between 1906 and 1914, for pieces such as La Contemplation (Study for 'Contemplation'), which is held by the National Gallery of Ireland. He began a new work, when he was drafted into the army after the outbreak of World War I.

== Military career and writing ==
Lemercier's military service began in 1906 when he joined the 106th Regiment of infantry in Chalons-sur-Marne. As Lemercier was enrolled in higher education, his service was just one year. After his drafting back into the army in August 1914, he wrote to his mother almost every day from 4 August 1914 until 6 April 1915. He also wrote to his grandmother, and to a circle of friends. During September and October, Lemercier was in what he called "the zone of the horrors", during which time he received no correspondence and he wrote in his diary. His writings are held by the National Library of Ireland (NLI), as a first-hand testimony of the war. He disappeared, presumed dead, during the Battle of Les Éparges in April 1915.

The collection in the NLI consists of 263 letters and postcards, two journals and photographs, as well as letters from his mother about his correspondence and artworks. The letters were published as Lettres d'un soldat : août 1914-avril 1915.
