= Charles Pierre Corvisart =

French Army general

Charles Pierre René Victor Corvisart
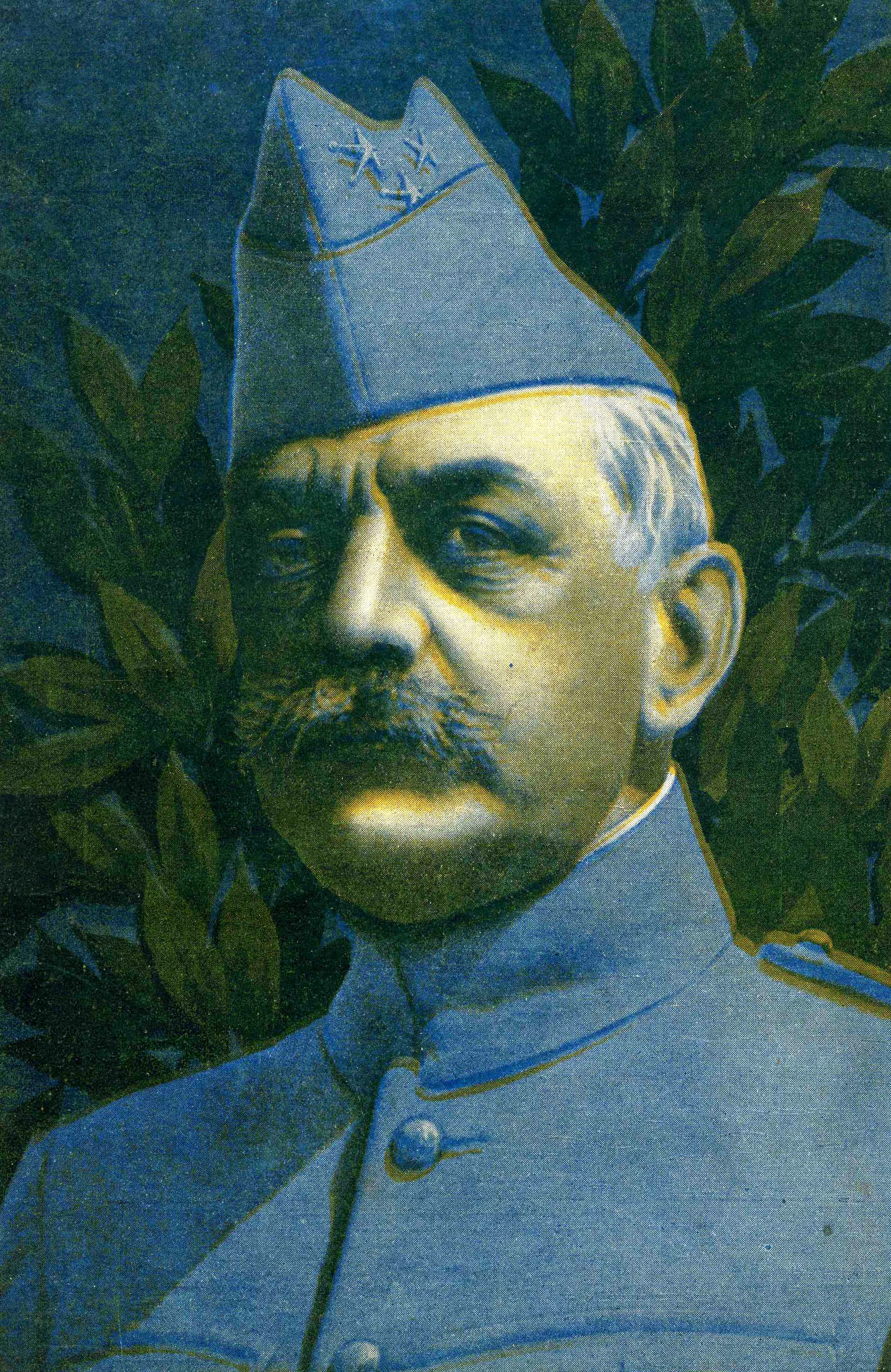
- Charles Pierre René Victoire Corvisart
- Born: 29 June 1857; Saint-Cloud, France
- Died: 7 March 1939 (aged 81) Paris, France
- Allegiance: France
- Branch: French Army
- Service years: 1877–1919
- Rank: Major General
- Commands: 123rd Infantry Division; 16th Army Corps
- Conflicts: World War I
- Awards: Legion of Honor; Croix de Guerre; Order of the Crown of Italy; Distinguished Service Medal; Order of Saint Michael and Saint George

Baron Charles Pierre René Victor Corvisart (KCMG) (29 June 1857 – 7 May 1939) was a general in the French Army who rose to prominence in World War I and a diplomat.

== Biography ==
Corvisart was the grandnephew of Napoleon I's personal physician Jean-Nicolas Corvisart, and son of Baron Francois Remy Corvisart Lucien (1824–1882), medical officer of Health Service of the French Second Empire. He was born at Château de Saint-Cloud, outside of Paris, and was a playmate of the Prince Imperial as a child. In 1877 he entered the École spéciale militaire de Saint-Cyr, where he specialized in cavalry.

From January 1900 to July 1904, Corvisart was a lieutenant-colonel and military attache at the French embassy in Tokyo, Japan, and subsequently served as an official observer to Japanese operations in the Russo-Japanese War of 1904-1905. He was promoted to colonel in 1906. During his stay in Japan, he learned Japanese, and translates and annotated the official Japanese Field Service Regulations of the Imperial Japanese Army in 1907.

On 28 July 1911, Corvisart was promoted to brigadier general and was in command of the 11th Dragoon Brigade at the start of World War I. He was transferred to command the French 9th Infantry Division on 2 August 1915 and the 123rd French Infantry Division of 14 June 1915. He rose to command the French 16th Army Corps on 30 April 1917. He was awarded the Grand Officer of the Legion of Honor by the French government and the Army Distinguished Service Medal by the United States government for his role in the Battle of Verdun.

After the end of the war, he served as a military attache to the French embassy in London from 2 September 1918. He went into the reserves on 29 June 1919 and retired completely from military service on 31 October 1919.

== Honors ==
- Legion of Honor (07/10/1999), Officer (30/12/2008), Commander (27/04/16), Grand Officier (01/10/17)
- Croix de Guerre 1914–1918 2 fins
- Commander and Grand Officer of the Order of the Crown of Italy ( Italy )
- Knight Commander of the Order of Saint Michael and Saint George ( UK )
- Distinguished Service Medal, US, 1923.

== Selected works ==
- 1909 — Reglement du 14 octobre 1907 sur le service en campagne dans l'armee japonaise, suivi des prescriptions pour les manoeuvres. Traduit du japonais et annoté par le colonel Corvisart. Avec 19 figures ou tableaux (translated from the official Japanese Field Service Regulations). Paris, Berger Levrault.

== See also ==
- Military attachés and observers in the Russo-Japanese War
