= Bertrand Fagalde =

- Born: July 22, 1878; Boghar, Algeria
- Died: February 6, 1966 (aged 87); Garches, Paris, France
- Military career
- Allegiance: French Third Republic
- Branch: Army
- Service years: 1899–1945
- Rank: Général de corps d'armée
- Unit: 5th Army
- Commands: 16th Army Corps
- Conflicts: Battle of Dunkirk; World War I; World War II
- Awards: Grand officier de la Légion d'honneur

Marie Bertrand Alfred Fagalde (22 July 1878, Boghar, Algeria – 6 February 1966, Garches, Paris) was a French Army officer.

== Life ==
He studied at the École de guerre between 1905 and 1907, graduating top of his class. He was promoted to captain on 24 June 1910. He was on the staff of the 5th Army on the outbreak of the First World War. An Anglophile, he was sent to London as a liaison officer in 1917. By the war's end he had reached the rank of lieutenant-colonel.

On 19 June 1939 he was promoted to général de corps d'armée and assigned to 16th Army Corps in 7th Army. He fought in Flanders in May and June 1940 and also took part in the battle of Dunkirk, commanding the western perimeter defence alongside French Admiral Abrial whilst the British General Ronald Forbes Adam of III Corps commanded the eastern British sector of the perimeter. Fagalde was made a Grand Officier of the Légion d'honneur by Maxime Weygand on 4 June for his conduct during the battle, but was captured on 18 June and imprisoned in Königstein Castle near Dresden in eastern Germany.

He was liberated by the Soviet Army on 9 May 1945 but just after his return to France he was indicted for "intelligence with the enemy" or "acts harming national defence" during his captivity. He was accused of having asked to join the Waffen SS for unknown reasons, although he was held to have retracted the offer when he found out he would have to wear German uniform. He was found guilty and sentenced to five years' solitary confinement, loss of his rank and confiscation of his property. The case was later re-opened, all the accusations dropped and his reputation reinstated.
