= Joseph Chevillon =

French physician and politician

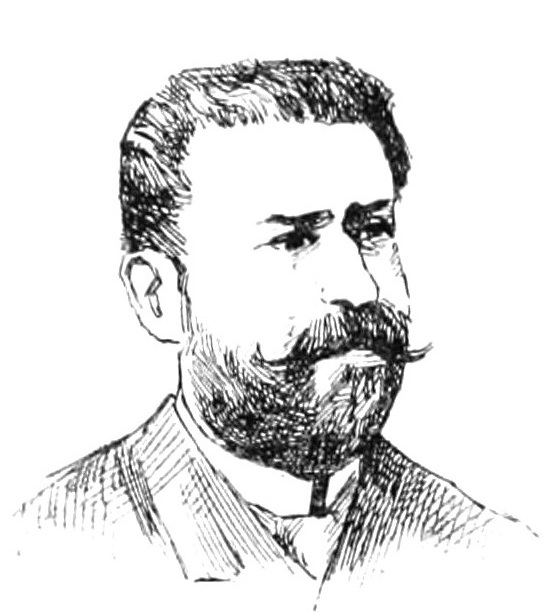
- Drawing of Chevillon in 1898
- Born: Joseph, Marie, Eugène Chevillon; 21 March 1849; Marseille, Bouches-du-Rhône, Provence-Alpes-Côte d'Azur, France
- Died: 29 April 1910 (aged 61); Marseille, Bouches-du-Rhône, Provence-Alpes-Côte d'Azur, France
- Education: Lycée Thiers; University of Paris
- Occupation: Politician
- Children: Frédéric Chevillon

Joseph Chevillon (1849-1910) was a French physician and politician.

== Early life ==
Joseph Chevillon was born on 21 March 1849 in Marseille, France. Both his father and his uncle were physicians. He was educated at the Lycée Thiers in Marseille. He then studied medicine at the University of Paris.

He served in the Franco-Prussian War of 1870–1871.

== Career ==
Chevillon started his career as a physician in Marseille shortly after the war. He played a significant role in the cholera epidemic of 1884 in Marseille, serving on a committee to combat the disease. The epidemic led to a death toll of 1,777.

He served as a member of the Chamber of Deputies from 1885 to 1889, and from 1893 to 1902. He was far-left. He was an early supporter of General Georges Boulanger and he opposed retaliations against the Ligue des Patriotes.

== Death ==
He died on 29 April 1910 in Marseille.
