= Henri Raybaud =

French sculptor

Henri Charles Raybaud (born 4 June 1879 in Marseille-16 August,1942) was a French sculptor.

He studied in Paris under Gabriel Thomas and Jean-Antoine Injalbert and made his debut at the Paris Salon des Artistes Français in 1904 with the work "Le Berger et la mer" a plaster bas-relief now held by Marseille's Musée des Beaux-Arts.

== Main works ==
Name	Location	Date	Notes
"The produce of Provence"	La gare Saint-Charles de Marseille	1923 to 1924	This main railway station has a large flight of stairs designed by the architects Eugène Sénès and Léon Arnal and using reinforced concrete. The competition for the designs of the stairway, intended to improve movement between the town centre and the railway station forecourt, was opened in 1911 but the 1914-1918 war delayed completion of the project until 1925. The stairs run from the railway station to the Boulevard d'Athènes. The area is the site of much sculptural work including a group of lions and children by Arry Bitter and the works "Marseille Colonie Grecque" and "Marseille Porte d'Orient" by Auguste Carli. There are also six small bronze groups representing the produce of Provence. These are by Henri Raybaud and cover "les vendages", "les fruits", "la pêche", "les fleurs", "la moisson" and "la chasse". At the bottom of either side of the main stairs are two large sculptures by Louis Botinelly. One, called "Colonies d'Asie", represents colonial Asia and the other, called "Colonies d'Afrique", represents colonial Africa.

== Images of Reybaud's bronzes by the Gare Saint-Charles stairway ==
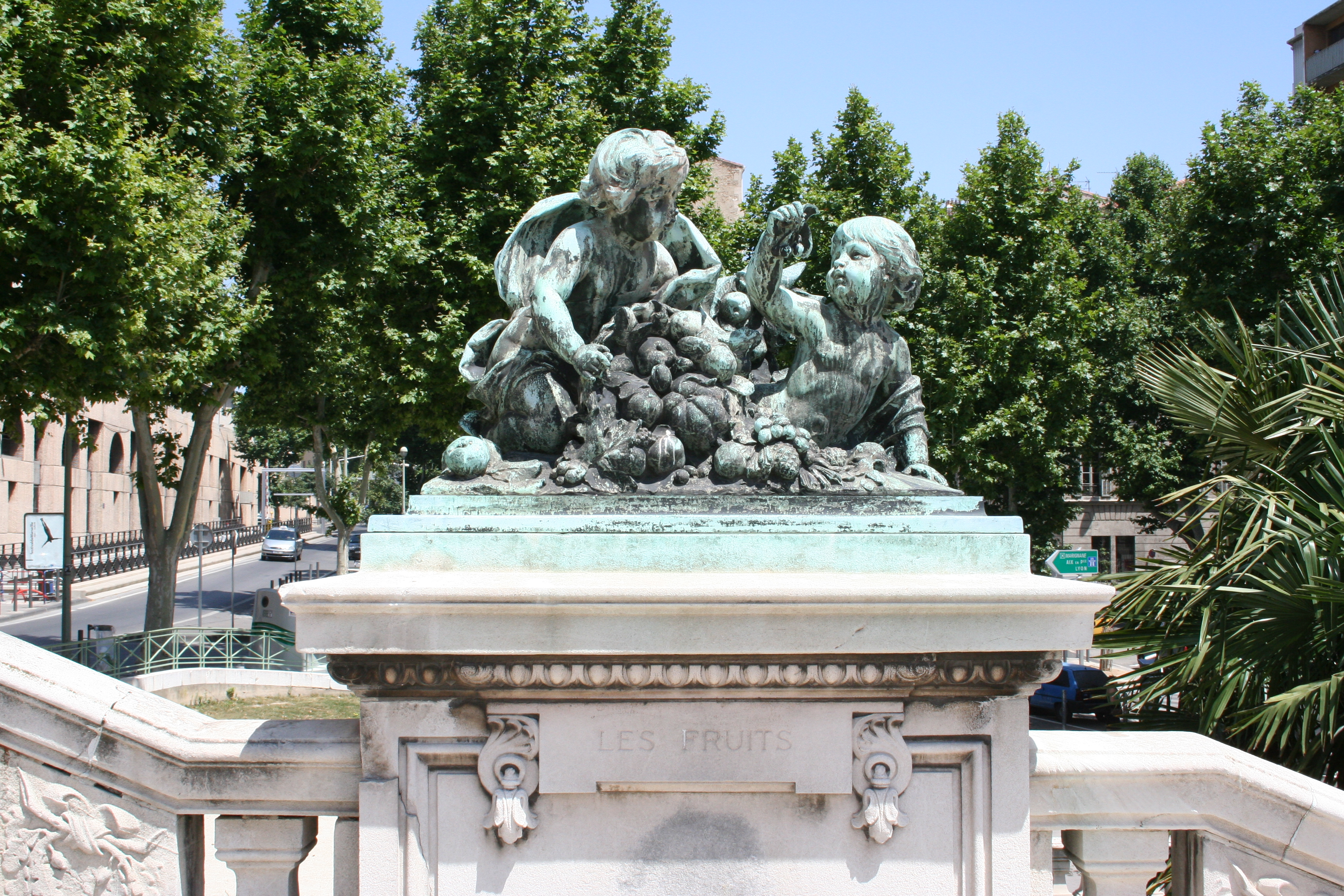
"Les fruits"

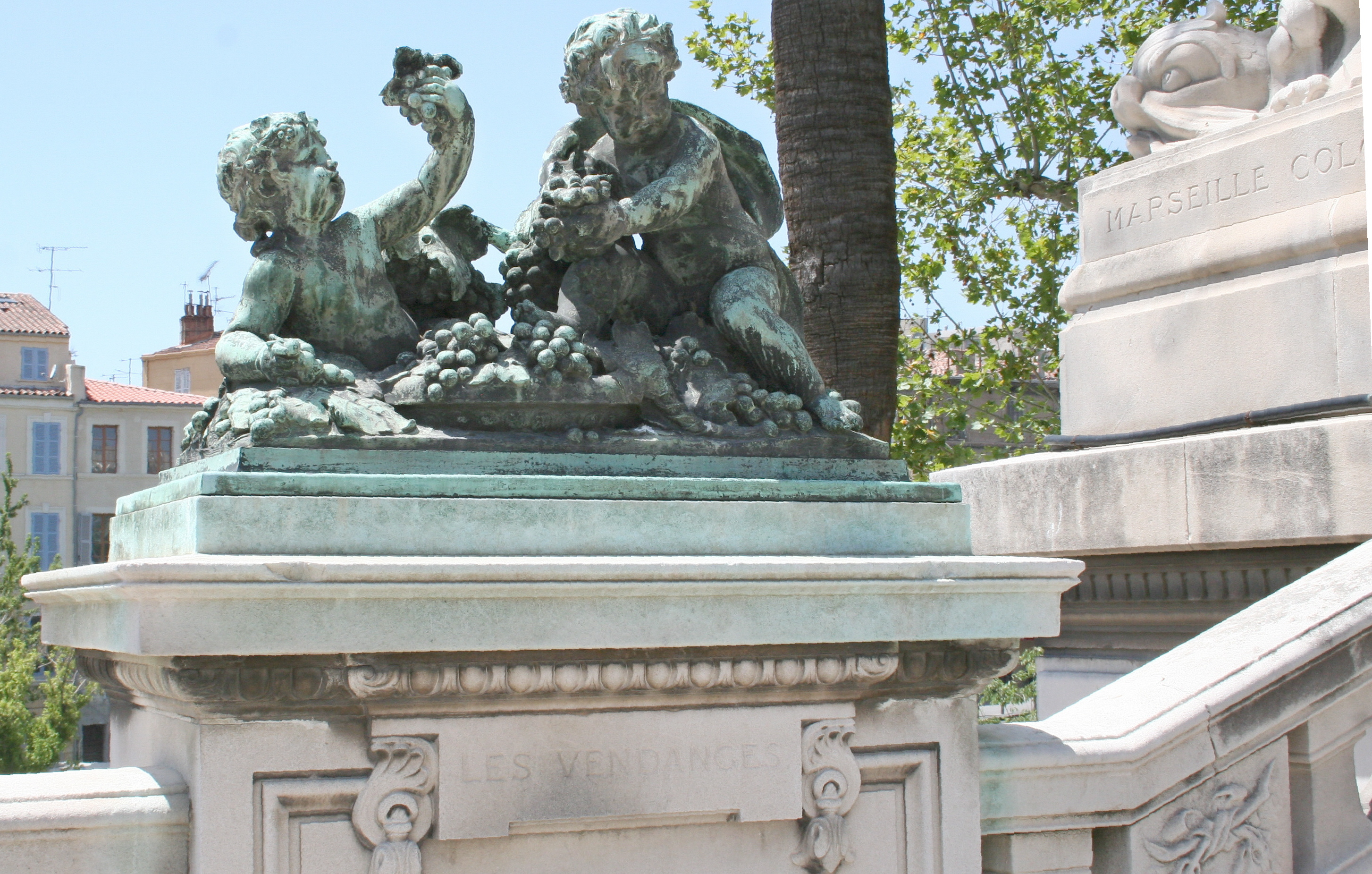
"Les vendages"

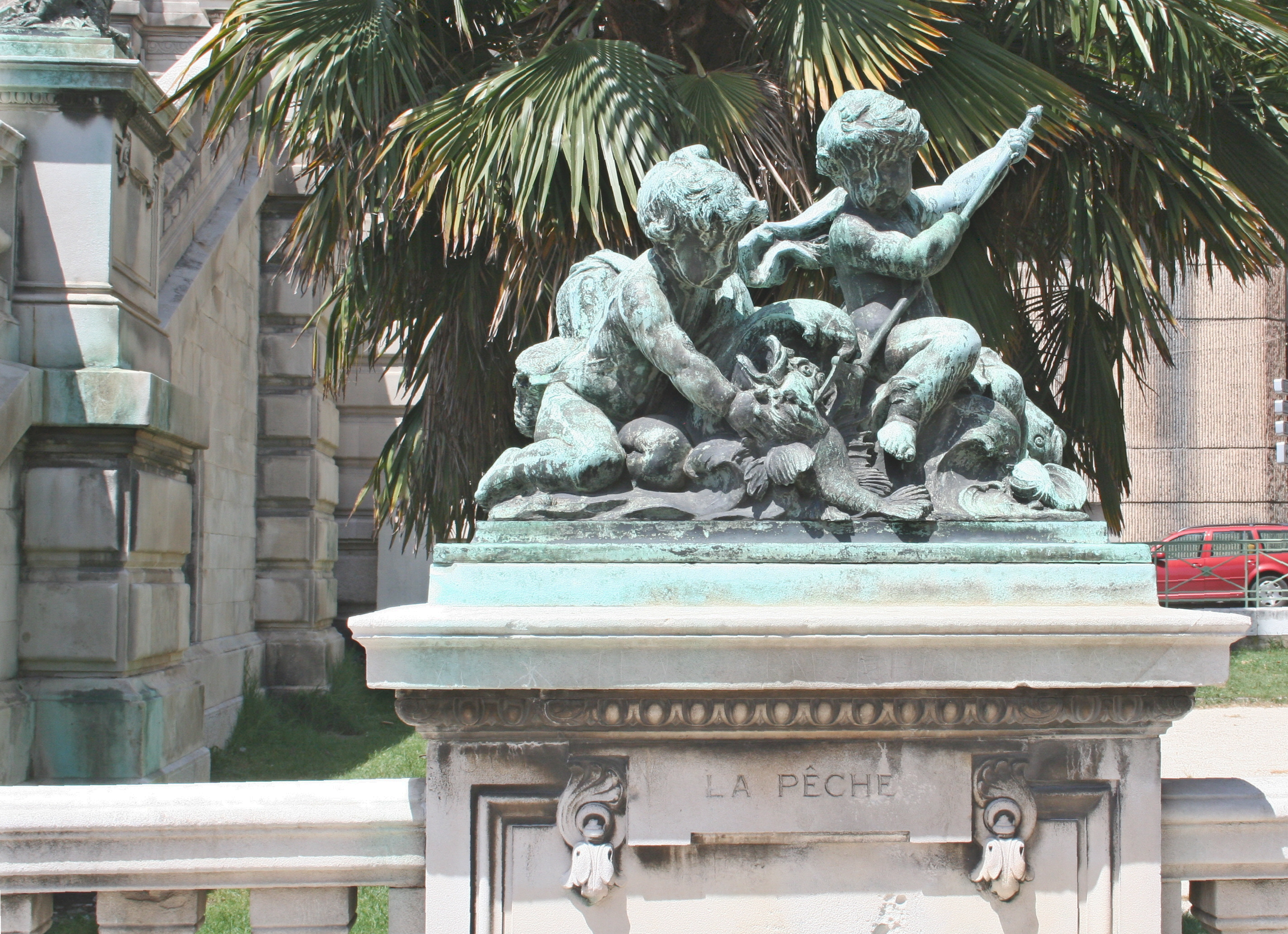
"la pêche"

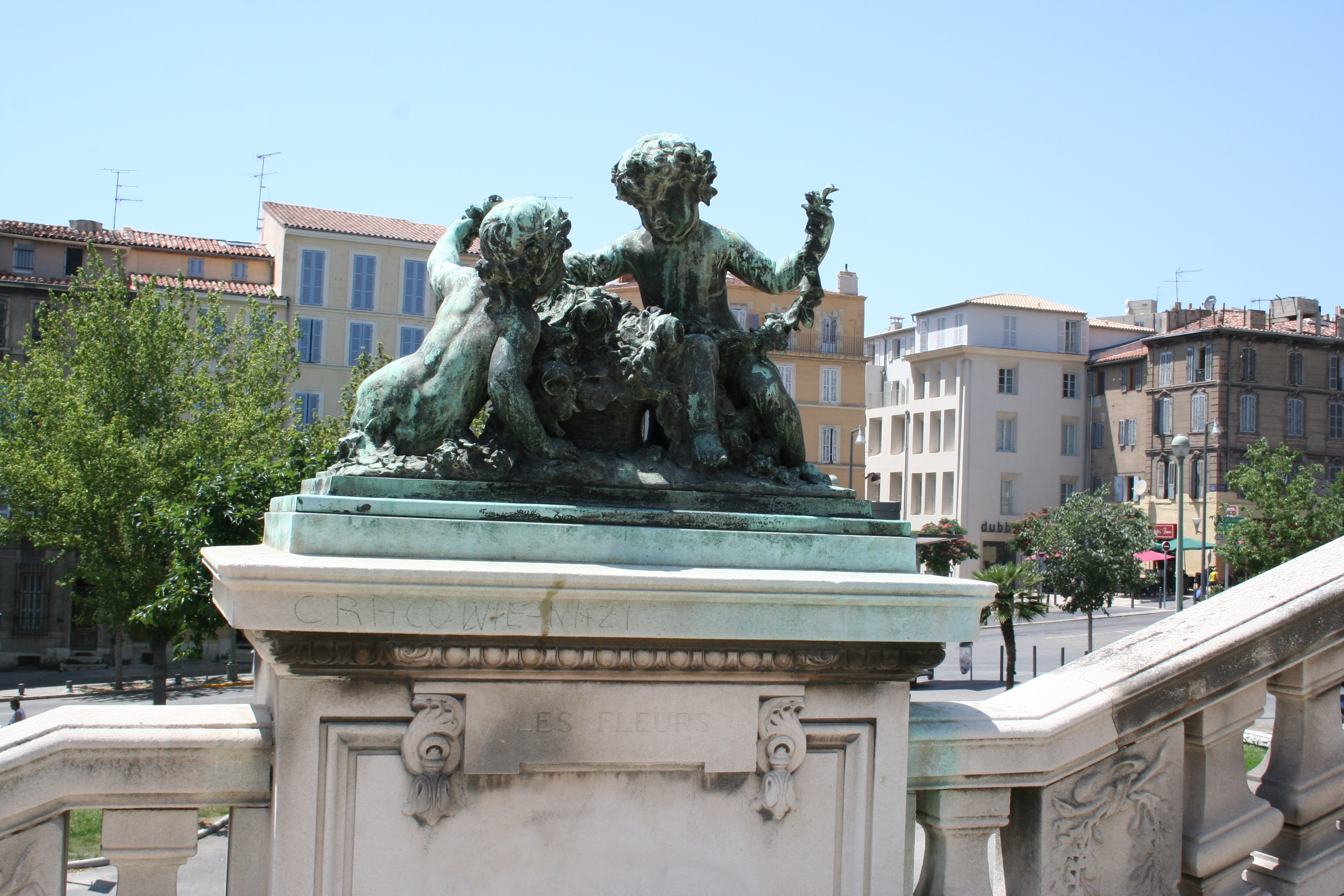
"Les Fleurs"

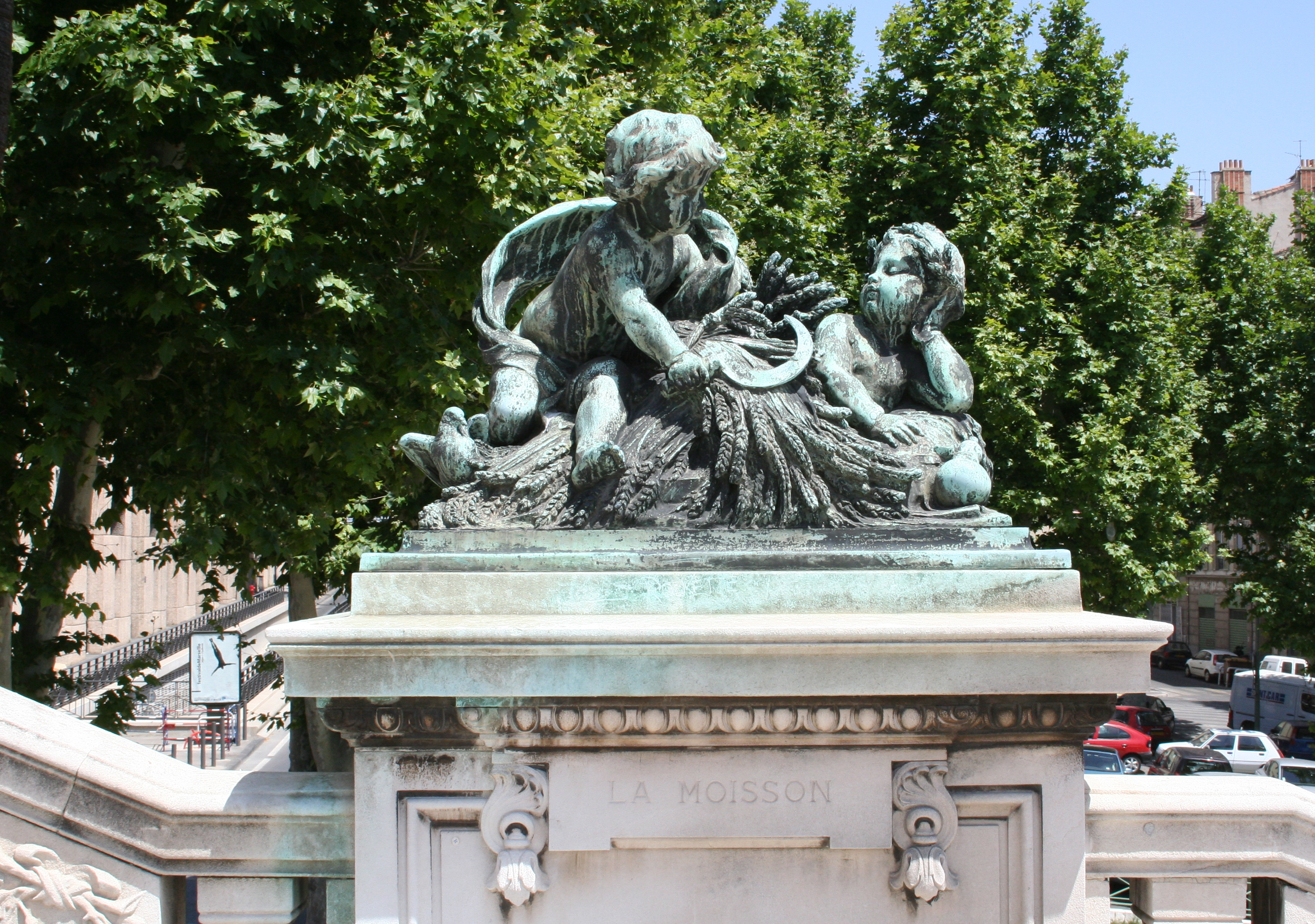
"la moisson"

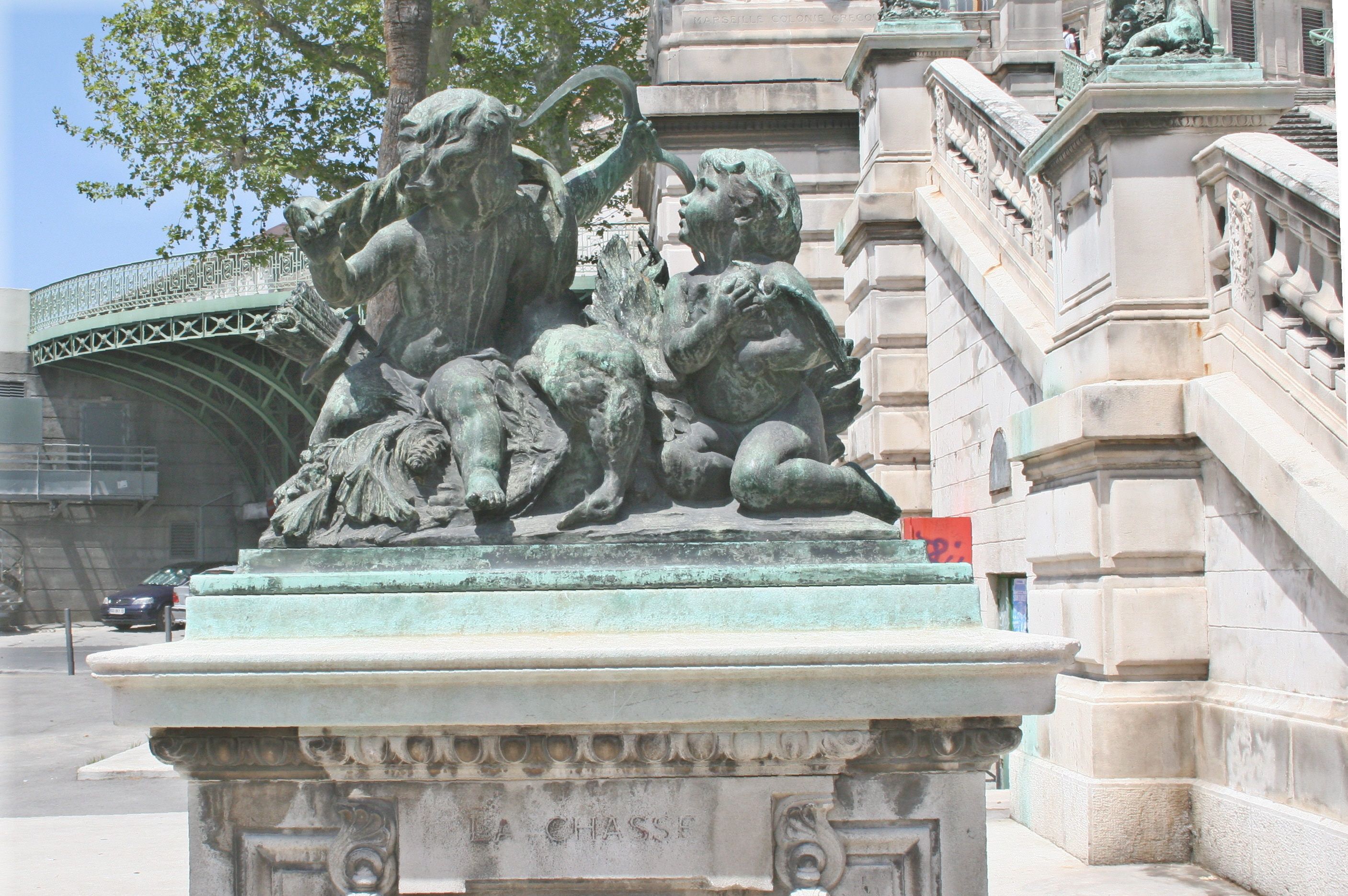
"la chasse"

== Main works (continued) ==
Name	Location	Date	Notes
"Mireille"	Marseille. Musée des Beaux-arts		A depiction of Frédéric Mistral's famous character.
"L'Orage"	Marseille. Musée des Beaux-arts	1908	A plaster bas-relief.
Monument to Dom Joseph-Dominique d'Inguimbert	Carpentras		This monument stands in the place de l'Hôpital. The bronze was removed in 1943 with the intention of melting the metal down for re-use but it was retrieved from a foundry in Lyon and re-erected in 1944.
Monument to Frédéric Chevillon	Marseille	1922	This monument stands in Marseille's place de la Corderie. Chevillon was killed fighting at Les Éparges in 1915. He was the mayor of Allauch and the parliamentary deputy for Bouches-du-Rhône. In Raybaud's composition, Chevillon stands feet apart whilst to his right an allegory of France pays hommage to him. A more modest monument by Reybaud can be seen in Allauch.

== War memorials ==
Name	Location	Date	Notes
Auriol War memorial (monument aux morts)	Auriol		In Auriol's Cours de Verdun, a winged "angel of victory" stands on a pedestal, her arms aloft. In one hand she holds a crown of laurel and an olive branch in the other.
Trets War memorial (monument aux morts)	Trets		The memorial in Trets' place de la Mairie depicts an "angel of victory" in profile who carries a standard in one hand which appears to flutter in the wind. In the other hand she holds a crown. The original intention was to place a cockerel at the top of the monument but this had to be dropped through lack of funds. The angel wears a helmet and stands on a globe.
Aubagne War memorial (monument aux morts)	Aubagne	1921	This memorial with sculptures in Carrara marble stands in Aubagne's place du Maréchal-Foch. On the top of the pedestal the "angel of victory", her wings spread, holds aloft a crown of laurels. She towers above two soldiers who stand in poses of defiance their hands linked. One wears an "Adrian" helmet and the other the beret of a "chasseur alpin". This part of the memorial was sculpted by François Carli. Below the pedestal, a woman, an allegory for Aubagne, stands with a child and draws their attention to the inscriptions on the monument. To her right are several indications of a " new dawn" including a crowing cockerel and the rays of the rising sun. This section of the memorial was executed by Raybaud.
