= Frédéric-Georges Herr =

French General (1855–1932 )

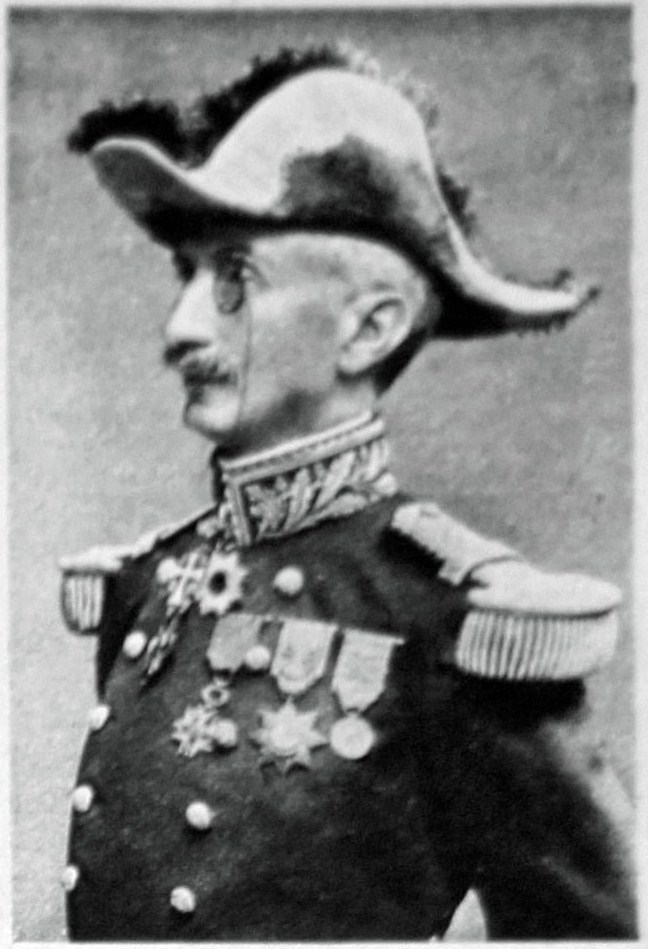
- Born: 7 May 1855; Neuf-Brisach, France
- Died: 27 October 1932 (aged 77); Paris, France
- Military career
- Allegiance: France
- Branch: Artillery
- Service years: 1874–1919
- Rank: División General
- Commands: 12th Infantry Division; 6th Army Corps; 2nd Army Corps; 16th Army Corps
- Conflicts: Franco-Hova Wars; First World War
- Awards: Grand Cross of the Legion of Honour

Frédéric-Georges Herr (7 May 1855 – 27 October 1932) was a French general.

== Pre-Military Career ==
Frédéric-Georges Herr was born on May 7 in Neuf-Brisach, France to Margare Emylida and Georges Jacques. Herr entered the École polytechnique in 1874.

Herr married Anne Peugeot, the heiress of the Peugeot family, in 1883.

== Military career ==
=== Conquest of Madagascar ===
Frédéric-Georges Herr enrolled into the military after he graduated. From 1895 to 1902, he took an active part in the colonization of Madagascar under the order of General Gallieni. During the conquest, he commanded the 32nd Artillery Regiment and later the 6th Artillery Brigade where he stayed until world War I. For his service, he was promoted to Brigadier General in 1911.

=== World War I ===
During World War I, Herr was the commander of the 12th Infantry Division, he was involved in the battle of Éparges. and played a minor role in the Battle of Verdun. It is recorded Herr was in "a state of nervous collapse" as the German forces were overwhelming his troops. After being relieved at the Battle of Verdun, Herr was put into the head of the Centre for Artillery Studies in France and later on April 6, 1917, Herr was promoted to deputy chief of the General staff. On October 10 he was put as chief inspector of artillery training until October 24, 1919 where he was put into reserve.

== Post-Military Career ==
Herr went on to win the Grand Cross of the Legion of Honour. In 1923, he authored of the book: Herr, Général F-G. : L’Artillerie, ce qu’elle a été, ce qu’elle est, ce qu’elle doit être, Berger-Levrault éditeurs, Nancy, Paris, Strasbourg, 1924, 6e édition.

Herr died aged 77 on October 27, 1932.
