= Allauch =

Commune in Provence-Alpes-Côte d'Azur, France

- Commune
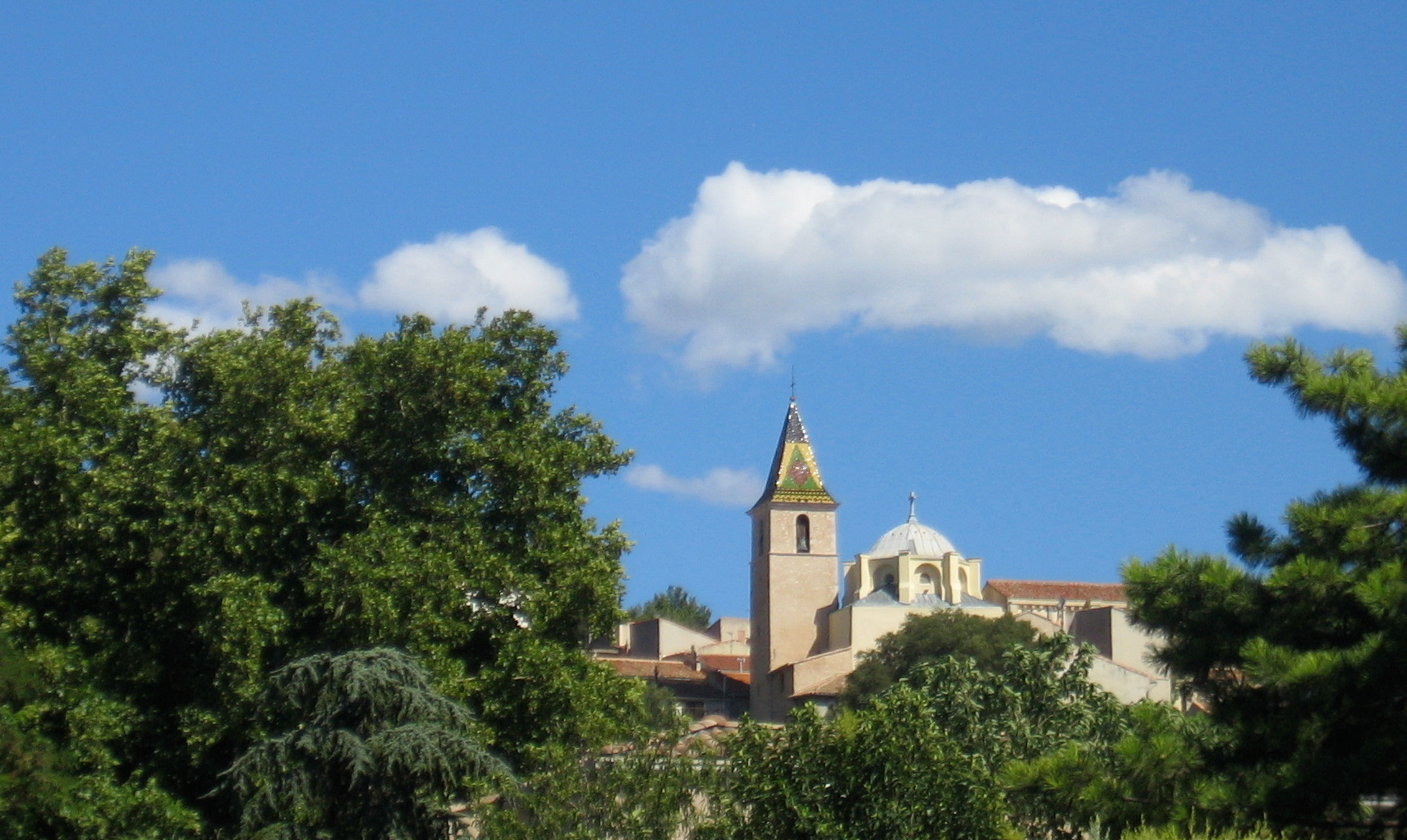
- The village of Allauch

- Flag Coat of arms
- Location of Allauch
- Location within France Location within Provence-Alpes-Côte d'Azur
- Coordinates: 43°20′13″N 5°28′58″E
- Country: France
- Region: Provence-Alpes-Côte d'Azur
- Department: Bouches-du-Rhône
- Arrondissement: Marseille
- Canton: Allauch
- Intercommunality: Aix-Marseille-Provence

Government
  - Mayor (2026–32): Lionel de Cala
- Area^{1}: 50.3 km^{2} (19.4 sq mi)
- Elevation: 223 m (732 ft)
- Highest elevation: 721 m (2,365 ft)
- Lowest elevation: 116 m (381 ft)
- Population (2023): 21,443
  - Density: 426/km^{2} (1,100/sq mi)
- Time zone: UTC+01:00 (CET)
  - Summer (DST): UTC+02:00 (CEST)
- INSEE/Postal code: 13002 /13190
- Dialling codes: 0491
- ^{1} French Land Register data, which excludes lakes, ponds, glaciers > 1 km^{2} (0.386 sq mi or 247 acres) and river estuaries.

Allauch (French pronunciation: [alo]; Occitan: Alaug) is a French commune situated east of Marseille in the department of Bouches-du-Rhône in the Provence-Alpes-Côte d'Azur region of France.

== Geography ==
=== Location ===
Allauch is the seat of the canton of Allauch. It is a part of the Aix-Marseille-Provence Metropolis. The commune had 21,372 inhabitants as of 2019.

It is located 12 km north-east of Marseille, 10 km north-east of Aubagne and 35 km south of Aix-en-Provence. Access to the commune is by the D908 road from Marseille in the south-west passing through the commune and continuing north to join the D96 north of La Bouilladisse. Access to the village is by the D48 branching off the D908 and looping back as the D48A. There is also the D4A road from the 11th arrondissement in the south, and the D44G from the 12th arrondissement in the south-west.

As Allauch is located on the edge of the Marseille conurbation there are numerous urban districts located within the commune. These are:

- 405 Santo Estello
- Bon Rencontre
- Carlevan
- Enco de Pont
- La Bourdonniere
- La Tuiliere
- Les Aubagnens
- Les Embucs
- Les Grands Louis
- Les Maurins
- Les Rampins
- Les Rascous
- Les Tourres
- Mordeau
- Saint-Roch

=== Urbanism ===
Allauch Village is located on the north-eastern fringe of the Marseille conurbation with large parts of the west of the commune also forming part of this conurbation joining with Plan-de-Cuques to the west.

Allauch is separated from Mimet by the massif of l'Étoile, resulting in it being necessary to detour to Cadolive in order to go from Allauch to Mimet. Similarly it is separated from the Aubagne urban area by the Garlaban hills to the south-east. Apart from the urban area in the west of the commune, the rest is heavily forested and mountainous.

=== Housing ===
Each year Allauch pays about €200,000 for missing social housing in order to reach the 20% required by the Urban Renewal Law (SRU). According to the commune however, available land is limited: of the 5,032 hectares of the commune a total of 4,000 is conservation land, 500 are already urbanized and the balance is sometimes affected by risks (flooding, collapse, fire, etc.). Recent increases in the price of land suitable for building has resulted in increasing difficulties in growing the social housing stock.

The City Council has decided that each construction project should have between 20% and 30% social housing. The first obstacle is that the commune owns little suitable land in built-up areas to build social housing (near schools, shops, services, transport, etc. to avoid creating "ghettos"). The value of the land is very high and the commune must sell land to social housing operators at well below the actual value. Furthermore, the municipality must guarantee 50% of the borrowings and contribute financially up to €20,000 per unit. The procedures are slow and it can take 3 or 4 years from the sales agreement and delivery of the first housing.

Another obstacle is that, in 2006, 108 applications for social housing (Social Housing loans) were made by the commune but only 48 were granted by the urban community to which the state has delegated its powers, while the State requires the construction of 64 units per year.

According to the Abbe Pierre Foundation for Disadvantaged Housing, of 319 housing units the commune should have built between 2002 and 2006 it has neither built nor funded any, something that Allaudiens were far from disapproving having re-elected the Povinelli list of candidates by 81.15% in the local elections in 2008.

The commune may have another opportunity to fulfil its obligation by purchasing existing housing through preemption to transform social housing.

=== Communications and transport ===
==== Communal Transport ====
RTM Routes

- Bus Route 144 connects the metro station at Marseille-La Rose to La Pounche, Pie d'Autry, and Allauch-Village.
- Bus Route 142/142JET/143 connect the Marseille-la-Rose metro station to Logis-Neuf, La Bourdonniere, and La Fève.
- Bus Route 7T connects the Métro-Bus-Tramway Foch-Cinq-Avenues (in the center of Marseille) to Barbaraou (Golf d'Allauch).

Buses to the Hills

The Hills buses connect to different urban areas of Allauch at certain times:

- Route A: La Fève - le Logis-Neuf – Allauch-Village – Carlevan - Les Embus - Marseille (Les Trois Lucs), with a bus every 30 minutes from 7:00 to 9:30am and 4:30 to 7:00pm.
- Route B: Plan-de-Cuques (Rond-point des Oliviers) – Allauch-Village – Fontvieille - Carlevan, with a bus every 20 minutes from 7:00 to 9:30am and 4:30 to 7:00pm.

=== Geology ===
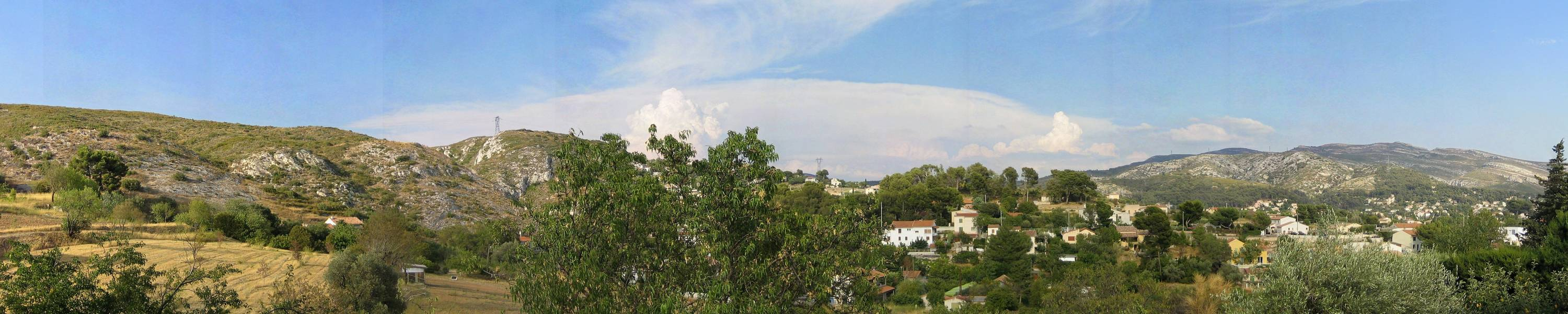
Panoramic View of Allauch

==== Seismicity ====
The Provence-Alpes-Côte d'Azur region has areas at risk of seismic activity, particularly in the Nice and Aix-en-Provence areas, but for Allauch the risks are negligible.

=== Hydrology ===
Detailed article: Canal de Marseille.

The Jarret is the main river in Allauch. Together with the Huveaune it was one of the only sources of water for Marseille for a long time. There are also two canals in the commune: the Canal de Provence and the Canal de Marseille, both built to supply many communes, but primarily Marseille, with drinking water and also for irrigation.

=== Climate ===
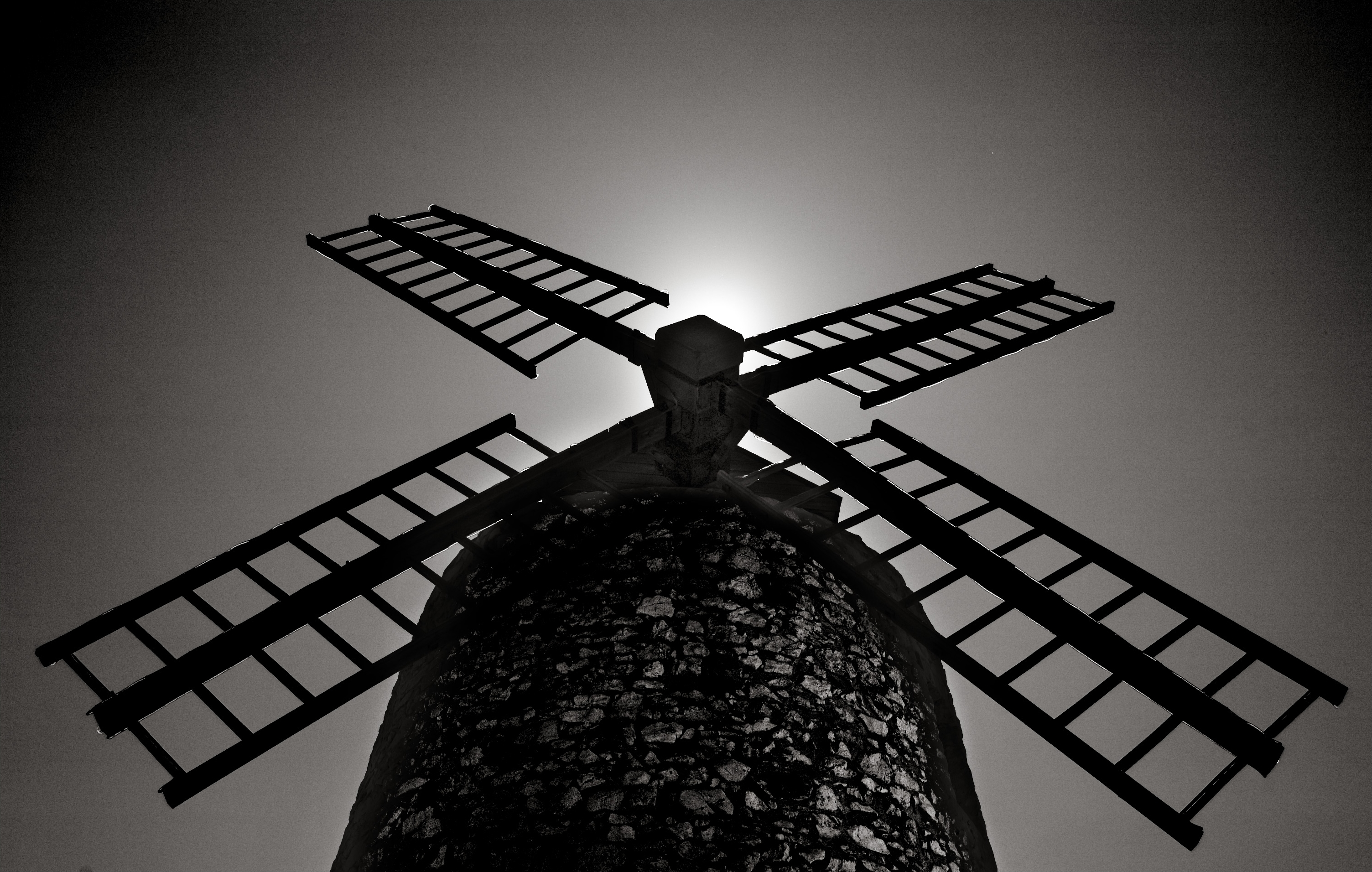
Windmill

Allauch has a Mediterranean climate: precipitation is mainly in September to May with a peak in October–November and a rather wet and mild winter. The summers are hot and dry.

Comparison of local Meteorological data with other cities in France
Town	Sunshine (hours/yr)	Rain (mm/yr)	Snow (days/yr)	Storm (days/yr)	Fog (days/yr)
National average	1,973	770	14	22	40
Allauch	2,835	514	1	20	10
Paris	1,661	637	12	18	10
Nice	2,724	767	1	29	1
Strasbourg	1,693	665	29	29	56
Brest	1,605	1,211	7	12	75

Weather Data for Allauch

Climate data for Marseille
Month	Jan	Feb	Mar	Apr	May	Jun	Jul	Aug	Sep	Oct	Nov	Dec	Year
Mean daily maximum °C (°F)	11.4 (52.5)	12.5 (54.5)	15.7 (60.3)	18.6 (65.5)	22.9 (73.2)	27.0 (80.6)	30.2 (86.4)	29.7 (85.5)	25.5 (77.9)	20.9 (69.6)	15.1 (59.2)	11.9 (53.4)	20.1 (68.2)
Daily mean °C (°F)	7.2 (45.0)	8.1 (46.6)	11.0 (51.8)	13.9 (57.0)	18.0 (64.4)	21.9 (71.4)	24.8 (76.6)	24.4 (75.9)	20.6 (69.1)	16.7 (62.1)	11.2 (52.2)	7.9 (46.2)	15.5 (59.9)
Mean daily minimum °C (°F)	2.9 (37.2)	3.6 (38.5)	6.2 (43.2)	9.1 (48.4)	13.1 (55.6)	16.6 (61.9)	19.4 (66.9)	19.0 (66.2)	15.7 (60.3)	12.4 (54.3)	7.2 (45.0)	4.0 (39.2)	10.8 (51.4)
Average precipitation mm (inches)	48.0 (1.89)	31.4 (1.24)	30.1 (1.19)	53.7 (2.11)	40.9 (1.61)	24.2 (0.95)	9.2 (0.36)	31.0 (1.22)	77.1 (3.04)	67.2 (2.65)	55.6 (2.19)	45.5 (1.79)	513.9 (20.23)
Average precipitation days (≥ 1 mm)	5.3	4.5	3.9	6.0	4.5	2.9	1.3	2.7	4.5	6.2	5.9	5.5	53.2
Mean monthly sunshine hours	151.3	166.3	229.6	239.7	288.1	328.8	366.3	327.0	257.3	189.1	153.6	138.2	2,835.3
Source: Meteorological data for Marseilles - 5m altitude, from 1981 to 2010 January 2015 (in French)

== History ==
The Hôtel de Ville

One of the objects found in the Baume Sourno Cave (dark cave) may have been used as a wedding gift for the young Gyptis. The history of Marseille has a story that Marseille was born from the union of a handsome Greek sailor and the daughter of King Nann, the chief of a Ligurian tribe around the year 600 BC. However, historians believe that Allauch was the chief town of a Ligurian tribe called ségobrige. The beautiful Gyptis could have been allaudienne and Marseille girl from Allauch. In Provence and in Allauch in particular people like legends.

A Coat of Arms was adopted by the town in 1727 and refers to the commune being the seat for the Saracens: in the 10th century the Moors besieged the village. At the brink of starvation the villagers, to deceive the enemy, sent twenty loaves and their remaining spear points. The Saracens were discouraged, imagining that abundance reigned behind the walls. They broke camp. It was night and the moon was in its last quarter with three stars shone around it. So the arms of Allauch have three stars, a crescent moon, and two silver wings (arrow quills).

Under the auspices of the canons of the Cathedral de la Major Marseille, the castle was built in the 12th century. There remains a postern, some ramparts, and Our Lady of the Castle which was built in 1148 . The pride of Allauch, it is still a place of worship and pilgrimage. The canons remained the Spiritual and Temporal Lords for nearly seven centuries until the French Revolution. They attracted a new population seeking land to cultivate. Then began a period of clearing the land and covering it with vineyards, olive groves, and wheat.

On the eve of the Revolution more than three-quarters of Allauch soil belonged to the peasants who worked it, about 20% by the nobles and bourgeois, and only 3% by the clergy. Throughout the 19th century Allauch declined: Agriculture and livestock stagnated as did the production of plaster and chalk extracted using traditional methods.

In contrast to the early 19th century, during the suppression of the free port of Marseille, Allauch was the scene of contraband tobacco. Probably practiced initially by only a few it soon became generalized and became the main industry of Allauch during the century ahead of the stone quarries, the plasterworks, and the bauxite deposits.

The Hôtel de Ville is a former seigneurial palace which was remodelled in around 1821.

The construction of the Canal de Marseille started a recovery: running water arrived in Allauch in 1888. Then an electric tram line connecting Marseille to Plan-de-Cuques came in 1902 followed by a connection to Bourdonnière and Allauch via Pounche in 1908: it was the end of isolation and confirmation of a new prosperity to come.

In the Decree of 25 March 1966 Allauch was classed as an urban commune and today Allauch has become increasingly a residential commune.

=== Heraldry ===
Arms of Allauch	Blazon: Azure, a crescent inverted of argent accompanied in base by 3 stars and in chief between two wings the same.

== Politics and Administration ==
=== Municipal Administration ===
The following table shows the share of seats on the Allauch Municipal Council:

Party	President	No. Seats	Status
PS	Roland Povinelli	30	majority
Extreme Left	Gilles Viallon	3	opposition

=== List of mayors ===
Mayors from the French Revolution to 1940

From	To	Name	Party	Position
1788	1788	Louis Ricard		
1788	1791	Jean-Francois Dieude		
1791	1792	Honoré-Marie Tratebas		
1792	1794	Joseph Michel		
1794	1794	Jean-Baptiste Chaillon		
1794	1794	Balthazard Daignan		
1797	1800	Laurent Guichard		
1800	1829	Bernard Bernard		
1829	1829	Jean-Baptiste Geofroy		
1831	1844	Ange-Marie Cauvin		
1844	1870	Louis Blanc		
1871	1871	Jean-Baptiste Bremond		
1871	1872	François Maillet		
1872	1874	Louis Bernard		
1874	1876	François Maillet		
1876	1876	Balthazard Rouviere		
1876	1879	Joseph Camoin		
1879	1881	Adrien Lieutard		
1881	1882	Vincent Roux		
1882	1888	Louis-Marie Tratebas		
1888	1910	Joseph Chevillon		
1910	1915	Frédéric Chevillon		
1915	1929	Alphonse Honnorat		
1929	1940	Louis Brunet		

Mayors from 1940

From	To	Name	Party	Position
1941	1941	Charles Saeteli		
1941	1944	Pierre Goreaud		
1944	1967	Louis Brunet		
1967	1971	Pierre Audoubert		
1971	1975	Jacques Gaillard		
1975	2020	Rolland Povinelli	PS	
2020	2026	Lionel De cala		

=== Quality of life ===
In the 1960s a study by Agam predicted population figures of 60 to 80,000 in Allauch in 2000. Today the commune has about 20,000 inhabitants. This is the result of political will of the various mayors who have never ceased to protect the hills, to restrict urbanisation, and contained demographic change.

According to the municipality, Allauch is an "art town" of greenery on the outskirts of Marseille with two-thirds of its territory consisting of hills while of the 119 communes in the department Allauch came 22nd highest for the housing tax (19.71% municipal rate in 2007) and 6th highest for the property tax (33.24% municipal rate in 2007).

The politics of the commune management of land use plan has both limited building areas in order not to distort the landscape and allowed only normal sized housing so that there would be sound economic development respecting the environment and refusing any infrastructure that denaturalises Allauch (highways, supermarkets, industries creating nuisances etc.) and saving natural areas and green belts.

There is in place a protection service for the hills with an annual budget of €350,000 (15 water tanks, 2,000 hours annually to monitor the start of any fires), clearing obligations, and reforestation.

In the vote on joining the Urban Community of Marseille Provence Métropole, Allauch commune voted against for fear of no longer having a voice regarding the land use plan. The joining of the urban community in 2000 may have reduced the decision-making powers of the commune in urban planning matters, highways, or street cleanliness by moving the decision-making centre but will perhaps achieve the construction of a school in Allauch.

== Twin towns – sister cities ==
Allauch is twinned with:

- Armavir, Armenia (2005)
- Kadima-Tzoran, Israel (2013)
- Vaterstetten, Germany (1982)
- Vico Equense, Italy (2004)

== Population and society ==
=== Population ===
The inhabitants of the commune are known as Allaudiens or Allaudiennes in French.

Historical population

Year	Pop.	±% p.a.
1793	3,263	—
1800	4,264	+3.90%
1806	4,381	+0.45%
1821	3,743	−1.04%
1831	3,711	−0.09%
1836	3,869	+0.84%
1841	3,669	−1.06%
1846	3,703	+0.18%
1851	3,688	−0.08%
1856	3,603	−0.47%
1861	3,644	+0.23%
1866	3,629	−0.08%
1872	3,258	−1.78%
1876	3,104	−1.20%
1881	2,884	−1.46%
1886	2,726	−1.12%
1891	3,073	+2.43%
1896	3,220	+0.94%
1901	3,245	+0.15%

Year	Pop.	±% p.a.
1906	3,337	+0.56%
1911	3,585	+1.44%
1921	4,462	+2.21%
1926	6,029	+6.20%
1931	7,799	+5.28%
1936	8,351	+1.38%
1946	7,148	−1.54%
1954	8,406	+2.05%
1962	8,528	+0.18%
1968	10,013	+2.71%
1975	11,149	+1.55%
1982	13,519	+2.79%
1990	16,092	+2.20%
1999	18,913	+1.81%
2007	18,747	−0.11%
2012	20,690	+1.99%
2017	21,187	+0.48%
2023	21,443	+0.20%

Source: EHESS and INSEE (1968-2023)

=== Age distribution ===
The population of Allauch is older than the average of the Bouches-du-Rhône department.

Percentage Distribution of Age Groups in Allauch and Bouches-du-Rhône Department in 2023

Population by age of Allauch, 2023 (%)

80+	8.1
65–79	17.6
55–64	15.1
40–54	19.4
25–39	14.1
15–24	9.1
0–14	16.6

Total: 100

male

female

Source: INSEE

Population by age of Bouches-du-Rhône, 2023 (%)

90+	6.4
75–89	14.9
60–74	12.5
45–59	19.2
30–44	18.2
15–29	11.9
0–14	16.9

Total: 100

male

female

Source: INSEE

Demographic Evolution 1968-2023
	1968-1975	1975-1982	1982-1990	1990–1999	1999-2007	2007-2012	2012-2017	2017-2023
Births (‰)	11.6	10.2	9.2	9.8	8.4	8.3	9.0	8.6
Deaths (‰)	15.6	13.5	10.4	10.0	11.0	8.9	8.7	9.9
Natural increase (%)	-0.4	-0.3	-0.1	-0.0	-0.3	-0.1	0.0	-0.1
Net migration (%)	2.0	3.1	2.3	1.8	0.2	2.0	0.5	0.3
Total population increase (%)	1.6	2.8	2.2	1.8	-0.1	2.0	0.5	0.2

=== Education ===
Each school has a computer site with 10 computers, a printer, a scanner and an internet connection. The school bus is free. Nearly 1,500 meals are prepared daily in the Allauch central kitchen and transported in heated units to the schools. Each student entering Grade 2 undergoes dental screening and receives a dictionary provided by the municipality. Sports instructors and lifeguards are involved in each class so that children can engage in physical activity provided by a professional. A spectacle is offered for all kindergarten children at Christmas and elementary classes benefit from €120 per teacher to complete their library and buy CDs. Prevention sessions and training are provided by the Departmental Educational Committee for Health.

Since 1994 Allauch has had a college attended by 950 students. A laptop with internet connection is paid for by the General Council for each fourth and third level student. A system of online scores for college students allows communication between parents, teachers, and students as well as simplifying administrative work.

The parents of students and the municipality are now fighting for the implementation of a college in the commune.

=== Security ===
Allauch is part of the Public Security District of Marseille which has the 13th highest crime rate of the 400 metropolitan districts of public safety. No details of crime in the commune or Allauch town is available.

=== Cultural events and festivals ===
Throughout the year, many events are held in the commune. Traditional festivals include the fire of Saint-Jean (which concludes a week of festivities), Saint-Clair (when six pigs are roasted on the spit all night and sold at auction), and the feast of Saint-Laurent (which involves a parade in traditional costumes).

A number of themed fairs and markets take place, as well as exhibitions of paintings or photos.

During the night before Christmas there is a Midnight Mass and a Provençal living Nativity runs down the descent of the shepherds to the sound of fifes, tambourines, bells, and bleating.

There are many events available to the public during the summer. Events such as concerts of classical music and intimate shows take place in the manor Bastide de Fontvieille, while larger events such as ballets, plays, and musicals take place in the Theatre of Nature. They allow the public to discover a range of artists and stage directors.

Two major events are organized by the Tourist Office: The crib in black light by Gilbert Orsini in December and January of each year and the Biennial of Contemporary Art.

=== Cultural and sporting activities ===
Allauch has a rare Museum of Sacred Art of France with a permanent collection of international renown and offers a range of temporary exhibitions on the theme of Religion or local culture.

The commune also has five community centres that offer activities close to home such as ballet, modern jazz, hip-hop, gymnastics, martial arts, painting workshops, mosaic and sculpture, theatre, guitar or piano lessons, yoga, sports, and scholastic support courses.

The commune manages and maintains many facilities which are available to twenty sports associations: team sports, gymnastics, swimming, judo, tennis, triathlon, modern pentathlon, Tae Kwon Do, and Kick Boxing.

Every Monday, Wednesday and Friday in July and August from 8pm to 1am, young people aged 14 to 25 years can enjoy free sports facilities supervised by qualified personnel (sports trainers, BAFA facilitators, lifeguards, etc.). A minibus service is free. In the days when "Sommer Sport" is on, young people from 12–17 years old can learn new skills in sometimes unusual sports such as tree climbing, netball, or Futsal.

Every year there are: the "La Ronde Allauch" foot race, the Cyclo-Cross, and the Trail of the Green Canton.

Allauch also has a 13-hole golf course.

=== Health ===
The Central Hospital of Allauch is a public health unit of 280 beds and places including a 30-bed Alzheimer care unit, a 25-bed nursing home, and 79 places in nursing homes to care for elderly and disabled people.

It has a total budget of 17 million Euros and more than 310 employees. 75% of patients are over 75 years old when they enter the hospital.

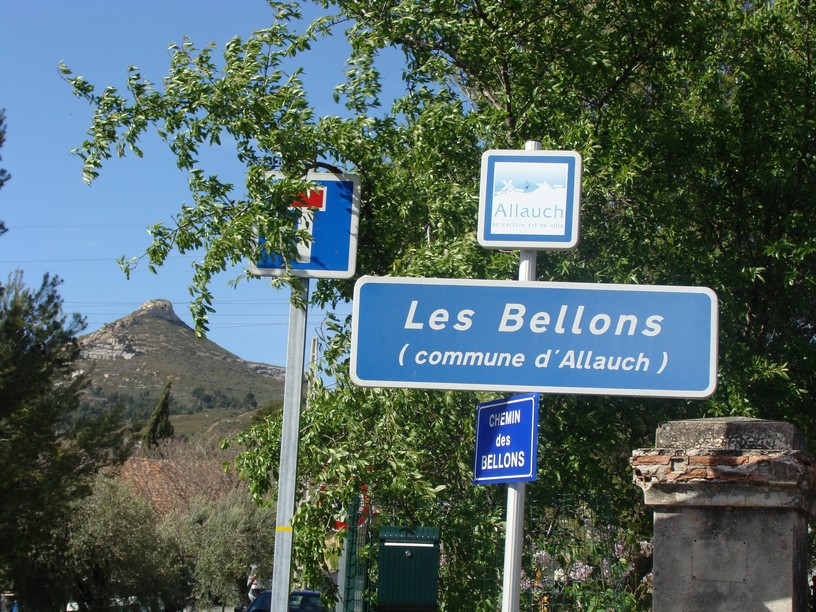
Chemin de Bellons which leads to the Bastide Neuve

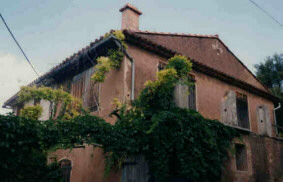
The Bastide Neuve

== Economy ==
=== Key figures ===
The figures shown below refer to 2017, unless otherwise indicated. As shown in the following table people are on average more affluent, better educated, and more skilled than the national average.

Single-family homes are more common than collective housing and the percentage of homeowners is much higher than the national average. The percentage of people living alone is much lower than the national average.

	Allauch	France
% Principle Residences	91.8%	82.2%
% Individual Houses	73.0%	55.7%
% Owner Occupied	71.7%	57.5%
% Households of 1 person	24.4%	36.2%
% Households without a car	7.4%	19.0%
% Households with 1 car	39.6%	46.6%
% Households with 2 cars or more	53.0%	34.4%
% Over 15 years old without a diploma	17.1%	22.8%
% Education at BAC+2 level or higher	38.8%	29.9%
% Executives	15.1%	18.1%
% Intermediate professions	32.3%	26.0%
% Employees	28.8%	27.7%
% Workers	12.1%	19.9%
Unemployment rate	9.4%	13.9%
Average income per household	€25,470	

=== Economy and tourism ===
In 2017 out of 9,136 Allaudiens who were employed, 21.5% worked in the commune and 78.5% elsewhere. 80.9% travelled to work by car.

Of the 3,661 jobs in the commune (2017), 47.1% were in the public sector (administration, education, health, social work) and 39.4% in trade and transport.

The Business Park of Fontvieille established in 1981 is the heart of the economic life of the commune. The criterion for acceptable settlement by the council is based on respect for the living environment by installing activities which do not create a nuisance or pollution.

The main activities fall into two divisions: food (nougat, cafés) and small tech industries.

Near the Business Park the Laphal laboratory, a pharmaceutical company of international renown, provides more than 130 jobs in the commune. It has attracted many companies with complementary activities (e.g. IPP Pharma).

Allauch has over a hundred shops spread over three main urban centres: le Village, Logis Neuf, and Pounche: food, health and hygiene, home furnishings, bars, restaurants, and services. A shopping mall was recently opened in Fontvieille.

Arts and crafts also have a place especially during the Christmas market: ironwork, pottery, glassware, fabric, and figurines.

Allauch has two Gîtes de France (homestays), 9 tourist apartments, one 3 star hotel, one 2 star hotel, two 1 star hotels, a guesthouse, and a residential hotel complex. There is no municipal campsite.

=== Local products ===
The craftsmen from the commune make black and white nougat, tooth snacks (hard biscuits), the suce-miel (sucking honey) made as chewing gum has been made for a hundred years.

One family who converted to agriculture produce different goat cheeses and fresh or refined raw milk.

In January during the festival of gastronomy some fifty craftsmen and farmers hold a market: there are honey, olive oil, AOC Côtes de Provence wine, Navettes de Marseille (Provençal pastries), Tapenade, Gibassier, Calisson, and Eggplant salads and appetizers on sale.

Allauch is also known for its Santons (figurines).

== Culture and heritage ==
=== Civil heritage ===
The commune has a number of buildings and structures that are registered as historical monuments:

- The Château de Fontvieille (1845)
- The Vallombert Country Residence at 495 Avenue du Vallon-Vert (19th century)

Other sites of interest

- The ruins of the Château de Ners in the Pichauris valley.
- The Esplanade of windmills consist of five windmills on an esplanade overlooking the bay of Marseille at 228 metres above sea level. Formerly located in the heart of the village, they were moved when the construction of the church of Saint Sebastian blocked their wind.
- The Vieux Bassin is an old reservoir from the 19th century now a living cultural exhibition hall
- The Museum of Allauch with symbols and sacred relics. The Allauch Museum welcomes visitors to the heart of the old village in the former building of the town hall which has been fully rehabilitated. The museum invites a new generation to better understand the foundations of Western Christian culture.

=== Religious heritage ===
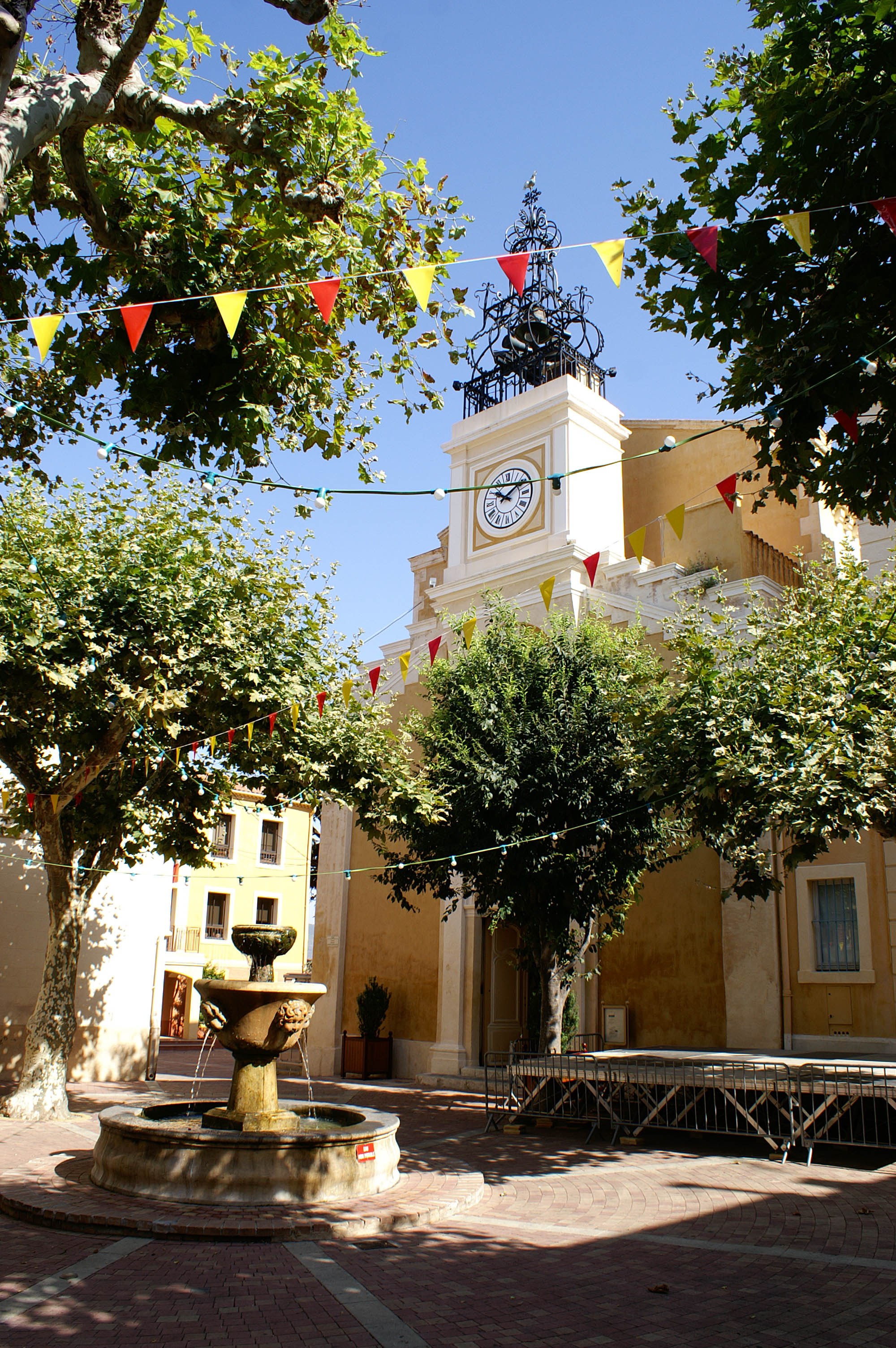
The Saint Sebastian Church

The commune has several religious buildings and structures that are registered as historical monuments:

- The Church of Saint Sebastian (1685). The church contains a large number of items that are registered as historical objects.
- The Chapel of Notre-Dame and remains of a Chateau (13th century). The chapel contains several items that are registered as historical objects:
  - The Gallery Organ (19th century)
  - 6 Candlesticks (18th century)
  - A Painting: The Calvary (17th century)
  - A Statue on base: Virgin and child (18th century)
  - A Statue on base: Browned Virgin and child (17th century)

Other religious sites of interest

- The Church of Saint Laurent of Bourdonnière
- The Synagogue of Logis Neuf

Paintings in the Saint Sebastion Church

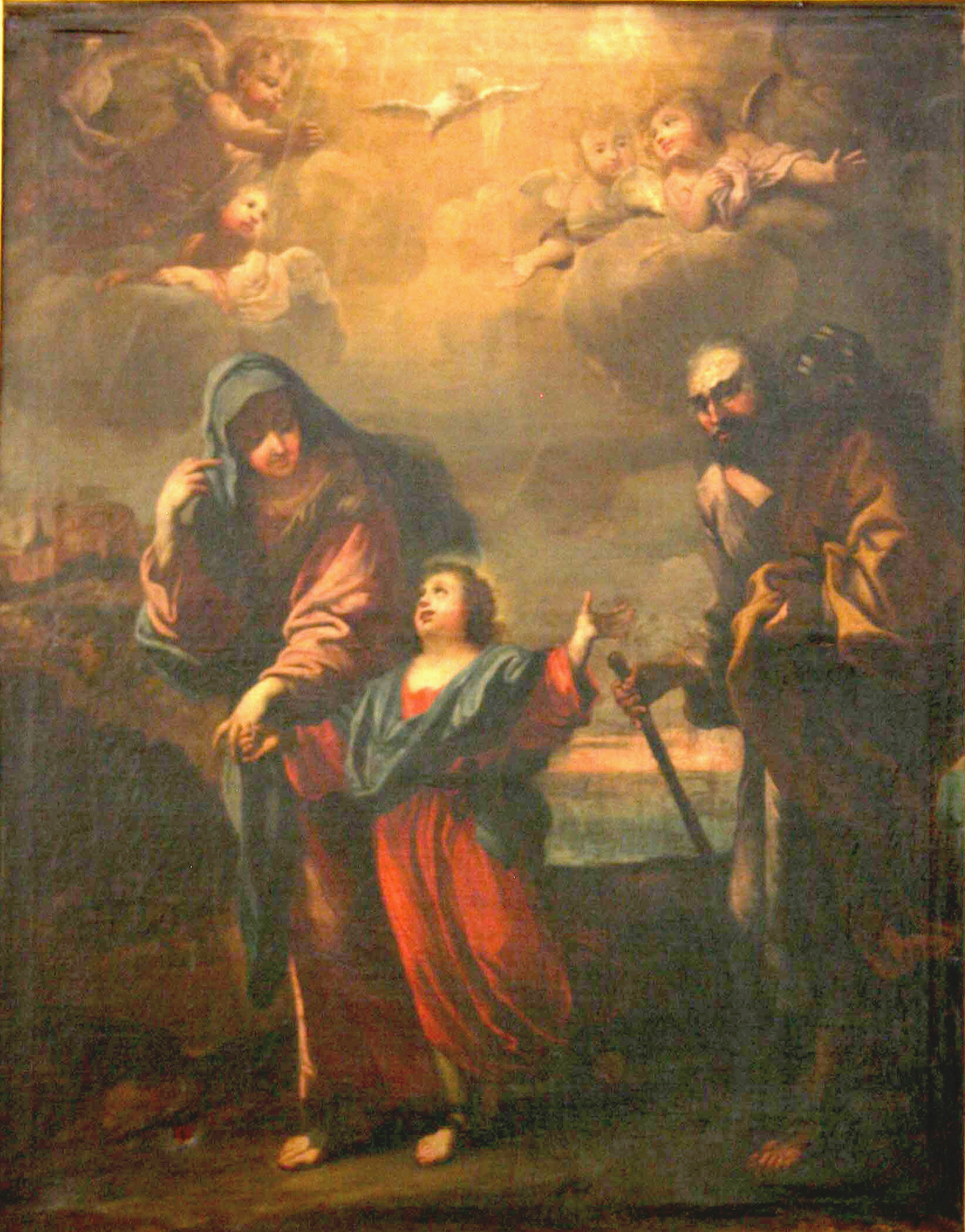
The flight from Egypt, Michel Serre

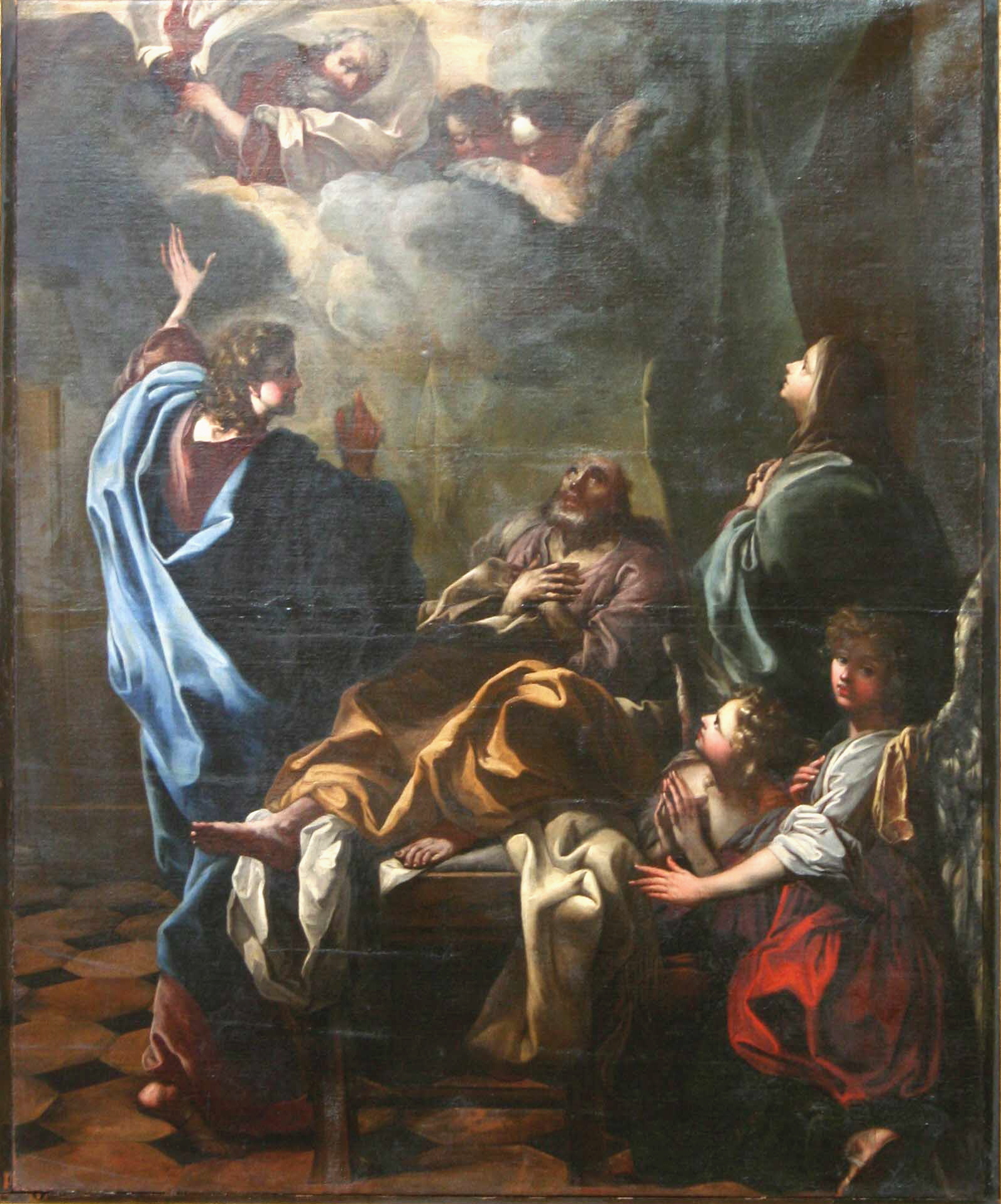
The death of Saint Joseph, Michel Serre

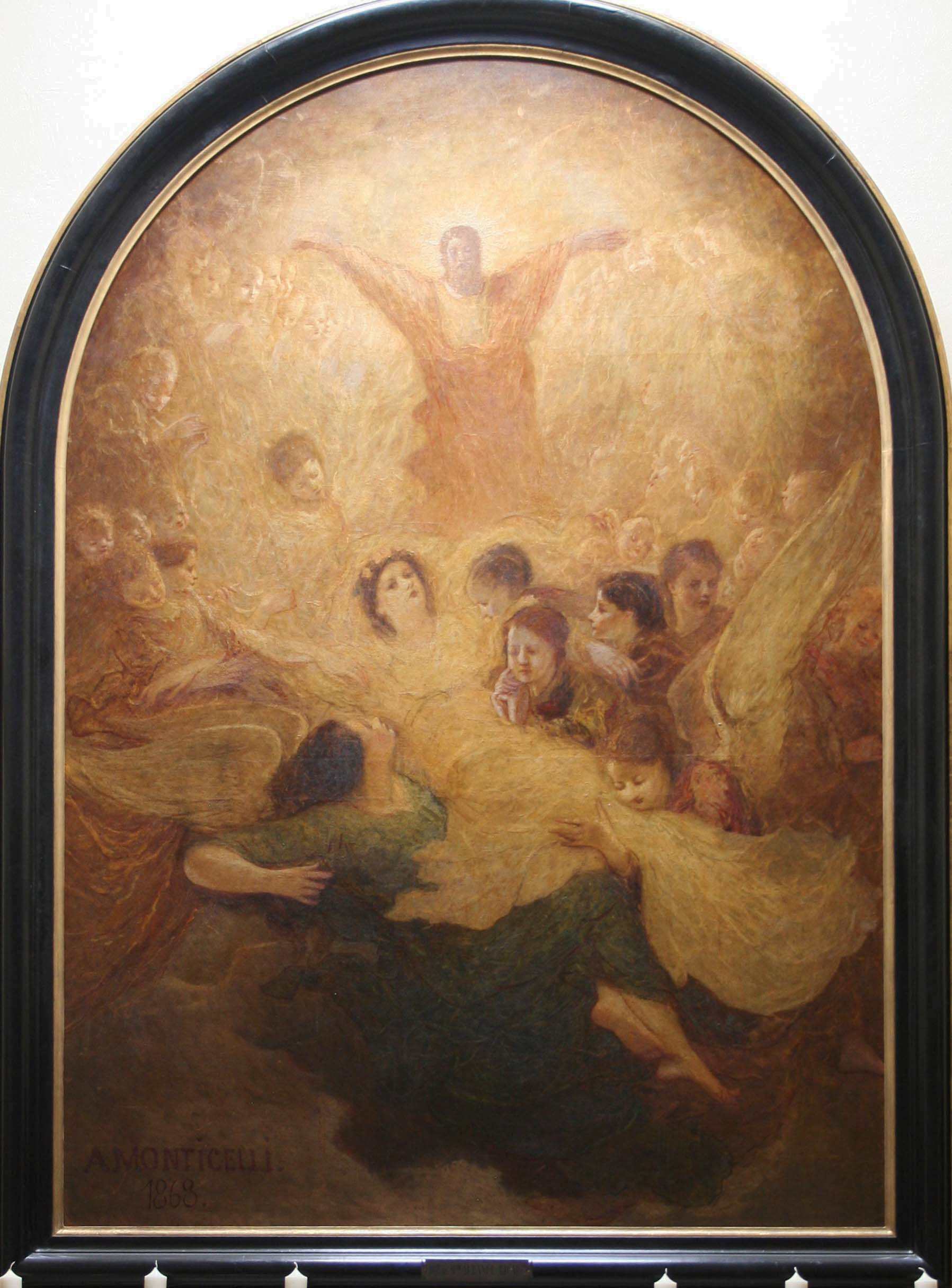
Young dead taken by angels from the heart of purgatory, Adolphe Monticelli, 1868

=== Environmental heritage ===
The Massif of Garlaban, also called the hills of Marcel Pagnol, overlooks the urban area.

== Notable people ==
- Thyde Monnier (1887–1967), Provençal writer (La Rue Courte, Nans le berger)
- Marcel Pagnol (1895–1974), writer and filmmaker. As a child he spent his holidays in the Bastide Neuve in the district of Bellons which, contrary to popular belief, is in the Allauch commune. In his Souvenirs d'enfance, he located many of his adventures in the hills of Allauch such as the "Grosibou Cave", the Baume Sourne, the Escaoupres etc. Later, he would write Manon des sources in these hills. Finally he shot scenes in his film Angèle in the old town (the Terrasse du Petit-Goûter, the Rue Frédéric-Chevillon) and others in the hills of Allauch (the Gours, the Jas de Batisto).

== See also ==
- Communes of the Bouches-du-Rhône department
- Cantons of the Bouches-du-Rhône department
- Arrondissements of the Bouches-du-Rhône department
- Henri Raybaud
