= Les Éparges =

- Commune
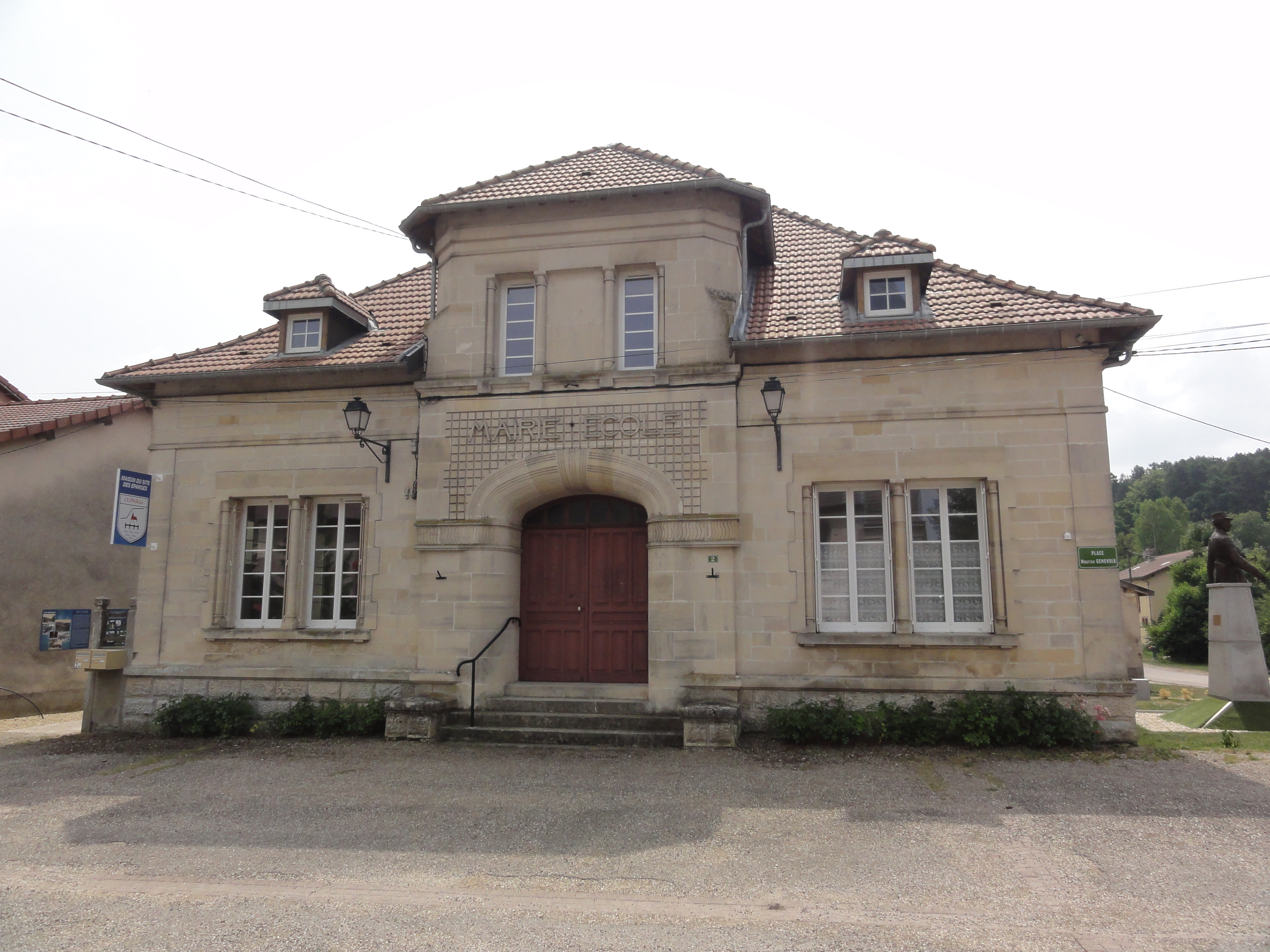
- The town hall in Les Éparges

- Coat of arms
- Location of Les Éparges
- Location within France Location within Grand Est
- Coordinates: 49°03′57″N 5°35′41″E
- Country: France
- Region: Grand Est
- Department: Meuse
- Arrondissement: Verdun
- Canton: Étain
- Intercommunality: Territoire de Fresnes-en-Woëvre

Government
  - Mayor (2020–2026): Xavier Pierson
- Area^{1}: 9.52 km^{2} (3.68 sq mi)
- Elevation: 267 m (876 ft)
- Highest elevation: 382 m (1,253 ft)
- Lowest elevation: 255 m (837 ft)
- Population (2023): 60
  - Density: 6.3/km^{2} (16/sq mi)
- Time zone: UTC+01:00 (CET)
  - Summer (DST): UTC+02:00 (CEST)
- INSEE/Postal code: 55172 /55160
- ^{1} French Land Register data, which excludes lakes, ponds, glaciers > 1 km^{2} (0.386 sq mi or 247 acres) and river estuaries.

Les Éparges (French pronunciation: [le.z‿epaʁʒ]) is a commune in the Meuse department in Grand Est in north-eastern France.

A ridge to the east of the village was the site of the fierce World War I engagement, Battle of Les Éparges, in 1915, and there are many memorials and monuments in the area.

== See also ==
- Communes of the Meuse department
- Parc naturel régional de Lorraine
- Battle of Les Éparges
