= 12th Infantry Division (France) =

- French: 12e Division d'Infanterie
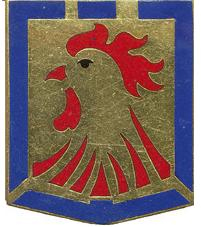
- Unit insignia (1939 - 1940)
- Active: 1813 - 1984
- Country: France
- Branch: French Army
- Type: Infantry
- Role: Motorised Infantry
- Engagements: Napoleonic Wars: Battle of the Nations; World War I: Battle of the Ardennes; First Battle of the Marne; Second Battle of the Aisne; Second Battle of Champagne World War II; Battle of Belgium; Battle of France; Battle of Dunkirk

Commanders
- Notable commanders: Gaston Janssen

Insignia
- Unit insgina (1979 - 1984)

12th Infantry Division (12e division d'infanterie or 12e DI) was an infantry division of the French Army which took part in the Napoleonic Wars, World War I and World War II. It fought at the Battle of the Nations in 1813. It was converted to a motorised infantry role at Mourmelon-le-Grand in 1939 a few days before the French declaration of war on Germany and renamed 12th Motorised Infantry Division (12e division d'infanterie motorisée or 12e DIM)

== History ==
=== World War I ===
It belonged to 6th Army Corps and had its headquarters at the Reims garrison as of 1 August 1914 and was mobilised in the 6th Region. Between 1 and 14 August it was taken by train to Vigneulles-lès-Hattonchâtel and ordered to defend the region around Heudicourt and Thillot. From 14 August it began to move a position near Fresnes-en-Woëvre, then near Etain. It went on the offensive towards Chiers on 21 August as part of the Battle of the Ardennes and the following day fought its way towards Ugny and Doncourt-lès-Longuyon, followed by fighting on the Crusnes and near the farm at Puiseaux and near Rèvemont on 23rd and near Arrancy on the 24th. On 25 August it withdrew to the west towards the River Meuse and new positions near Damvillers and Consenvoye. From 27 August it defended the river crossings around Gercourt and Brieulles-sur-Meuse and from 2 September resumed its withdrawal, this time south towards Montfaucon, Jubécourt and finally Rembercourt-aux-Pots. There it took part in the First Battle of the Marne from 6 to 20 September, including around Sommaisne and Rembercourt-aux-Pots during the battle of Revigny - one of the German officers attacking it was Erwin Rommel. On 14 September it began to be pursued towards Nixéville and Charny before it was able to hold its position around Ville-devant-Chaumont in bois d'Haumont. On 20 September it was taken out of the front-line and moved to Mouilly and Rupt-en-Woëvre. From 21 September it manned the front in the Braquis region opposite Étain until being urgently ordered to the trenches at Calonne to stop the German offensive. It marched towards Saint-Mihiel and the Hauts de Meuse and on 22 September arrived at Rupt in Woêvre and fought at Mouilly, the Calonne trench, Saint-Remy, positions in Les Éparges and in front of the Calonne trench-line. The front then stabilised and it was placed in a sector around the bois Loclont and Trésauvaux. It made an attack on the Calonne trench on 26 December.

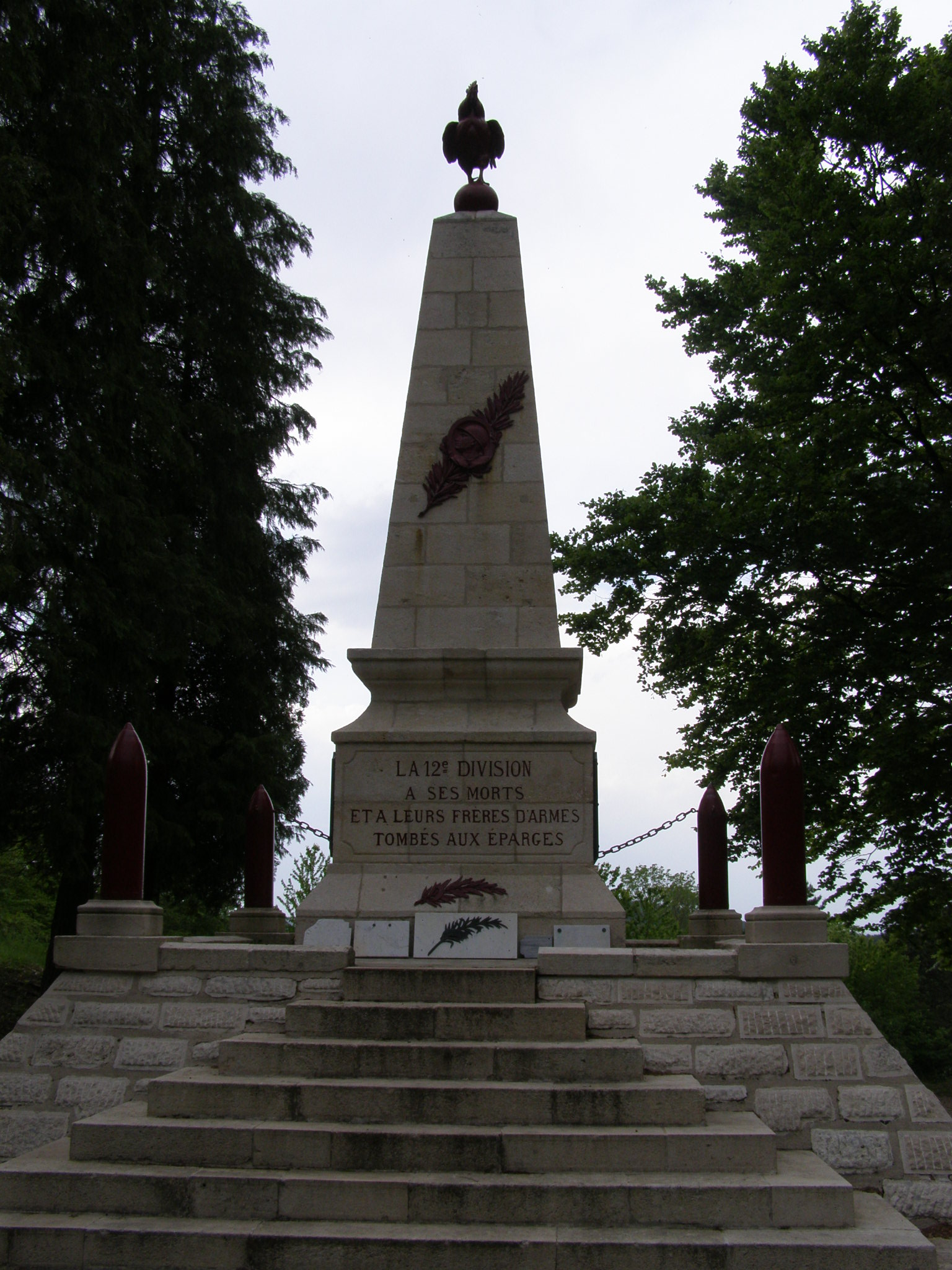
Monument to the division's dead at point C, crête des Éparges.

From 17 to 21 February 1915 it was involved in fierce fighting during the battle of Les Éparges, where it was also engaged resumed on 18th, 19 and 27 March. On 18–20 March it carried out a joint attack on Verdun with the Marche Infantry Division, originally planned for 10–11 March. 12th Division was ordered to capture two bastions to its west and east, joined by a trench - the trench and eastern bastion formed two intersecting lines of fire, whilst the western bastion formed three, all reinforced with underground bunkers. The French would attack from part of a spur taken in previous attacks, 50 metres away from the German positions. The explosion of mines made little effect, as did a 45-minute bombardment from 15:15 hours on 18 March. 132nd Line Infantry Regiment led the attack at 16:05, taking spur C fifteen minutes later but the German response meant the attack was bogged down by 17:00. By 19:00 132nd Regiment had reached a mid-point between points O and X and the attack resumed at 4:45 the following morning, but was held off by German machine-gunners at point X. French artillery opened fire on the eastern point of bois des Sapins from point N at 8:30 and the attack resumed again at 9:25, but was again held off. A German counter-attack was unsuccessful at 10:00 and an hour later the line stabilised. A fresh French artillery bombardment led to new attacks at midday and 16:00, but these both proved unsuccessful. The attack resumed again on 20 March at 4:00 and by 10:00 21st Division asked 24th Brigade to organise its positions.

=== Second World War ===
On the declaration of war on 3 September 1939 the division at Thionville in northern France and was placed on the border opposite the German troops advancing towards Kœnigsmacker near the end of the Maginot Line. After a month of fighting it was relieved and went into reserve near Hirson.

On 10 May 1940 the division was attached to 5th Army Corps, which formed part of 1st Army. Most of the division was sent to the Saint-Quentin area on that date, although 3e GRDI were stationed to the south of Maubeuge in accordance with the Dyle Plan, Plan Yellow and the order to occupy the Gembloux sector near Namur. 3e GRDI and the engineers of 2nd Engineer Regiment were soon moved to fight delaying actions in advance of the defensive positions between Rhisnes and Temploux. On the night of 10–11 May reconnaissance parties from these detachments advanced into Belgium and from 18:00 took up positions to the rear of the Cavalry Corps, which was holding the Tirlemont-Huy line. Meanwhile, the other elements of 12th Division set off at 17:00 to avoid the Luftwaffe, which had already gained air superiority.

On the morning of 12 May the first elements of the division arrived and its units deployed immediately into their positions, despite continued air attack in the Dyle region, particularly at Rhisnes and Temploux. Ahead of the positions the engineers prepared a line of twenty demolition charges, but on 13 May air attacks became more targeted and more frequent. Rhisnes and Temploux were attacked again, as was the divisional command post at Spy, Belgium, forcing it to move elsewhere. The infantry dug in and placed a line of anti-tank mines all along its front line, with artillery in camouflaged positions. By evening the division was the only French unit in the area which had arrived and was ready to fight. To the east the Germans had crossed the Albert Canal, refugees were flooding west, several cut-off Belgian units were falling back and 2nd French Cavalry Corps (made up of 2nd and 3rd Light Mechanised Divisions) was preparing to fall back after fighting all day at Hannut and Merdorp against German tanks and Stukas - 3e GRDI took over the liaison between these two light mechanised divisions. To the south the 9th French Army had lost several bridges over the Meuse and would have to counter-attack on 14 May alongside the powerful, armoured, 1re division cuirassée (1st Division of Cuirassers).

On 14 May Perwez was abandoned by the Belgian Chasseurs Ardennais, who fell back behind the positions held by 12th Division. The French cavalry corps under general Prioux also withdrew, using its last tanks to protect 12th Division's engineers, enabling them to blow the demolition charges between Hanret and Saint-Germain and regroup at Onoz. 3e GRDI covered the final part of the cavalry corps' withdrawal and suffered heavy losses. In the afternoon German light tanks attacked 150th Infantry Regiment's positions but rapidly withdrew under fire from 225th Artillery Regiment. At the end of the afternoon 150th Regiment's 1st Battalion and the 3e GRDI were given the order to turn south and hold the crossings of the Sambre Sambre à Floriffoux between Namur and Auvelais.

From dawn on 15 May the Luftwaffe resumed its attack on the crossroads, forests and marshalling points. That morning the 8th Zouave Regiment was attacked by German tanks, who were initially sent into retreat thanks to artillery fire. However, at the end of the morning the division received the order to withdraw towards the French border. To avoid air attack it abandoned its positions at night and the division fortified a line along the Charleroi canal running through Spy, Velaine and Fleurus. At the end of the night 3e GRDI covered the withdrawal of 5e DINA before destroying eleven bridges between Floreffe and Ham-sur-Sambre and rendering one more impassible to road traffic. At dawn on 16 May the division gathered at Orneau, where it received orders to rush to the area between Godarville and Motte-Courcelles on the canal to meet a German push across the Sambre to the south. At midday the division continued to withdraw, but the routes were clogged by refugees and other troops and still under constant air attack. At the end of the day the forward parties had only just reached Gosselies and Jumet. A detachment made up of elements of 106th Line Infantry Regiment and 3e GRDI under colonel Parent fought rearguard actions against advanced German units before retiring under cover of night.

During the night of 16–17 May most of the division's infantry regiments crossed the canal via the bridges at Roux and Courcelles and immediately deployed. The enemy penetrated the front in force across the Luttre bridge, which Belgian engineer units had failed to destroy, attacking and pressing 150th Regiment and 8th Zouaves, who formed the vanguard. 38e Combat Tanks Battalion and a group of reconnaissance squadrons from 3e GRDI under captain de Lannoy were given artillery support and managed to push the enemy back to the east bank of the canal. The front was re-established at 19:00, but a new order to withdraw came in and during the night of 17–18 May 12 Division took up new positions on high ground at Bavai. After German tanks attacked at Ciply on 19 May, the division's infantry was ordered to withdraw to Hainaut. The divisional commander had lost contact with his superior René Altmayer and decided to withdraw again towards Valenciennes by a night march, with 153 DIM taking up the rearguard position. On the evening of 20 May 12e DIM was switched to 3rd Army Corps and on 21 May 12 Division regrouped and headed for Bruay-en-Artois under cover of darkness. 106th Line Infantry Regiment was detached from the division on 22 May and taken north by truck to hold a fortified position between Cysoing and Mouchin, while the rest of 12th Division marched on foot from Bruay-en-Artois to Avelin. Fighting by day and marching by night, they managed to pass through encircling German troops to finally reach Dunkirk. Only 8,000 men of the division remained by this point and they were ordered to hold the French sector of the perimeter for nine days during the Operation Dynamo evacuation, holding off an overwhelmingly larger German force. The division's survivors were captured on the morning of 4 June on the beach at Malo-les-Bains.

=== Postwar ===
In 1960 during the Algerian War the division was part of the Oran Corps Area, responsible for the West Oran Zone, with its headquarters in Tlemcen.

The division's battle honors were officially recorded and promulgated by a Defence Historical Service decision of September 2007.

== Commanders ==
=== Pre-1914 ===
- 18 October 1873 : general Verge
- 25 November 1874 - 27 July 1875 : general Borel
- 21 May 1880 - 21 February 1884 : general Berge
- 26 April 1884 : general de La Hayerie
- 17 February 1890 : general Voisin
- 18 June 1892 : général Brugère
- 26 December 1893 - 30 November 1897 : general Kessler
- 28 December 1897 : general Gallimard
- 25 June 1899 - 30 July 1904 : colonel Hartschmidt
- 23 September 1904 - 18 August 1906 : general Besson
- 27 September 1906 : general Ferré
- 17 October 1908 - 14 March 1911 : general Général Valabrègue.
- 27 March 1911 : general Sarrail
- 1 October 1913 : general Besset
- 16 October 1913 : general Souchier

=== World War I ===
- 17 September 1914 : general Herr
- 15 November 1914 : general Paulinier
- 24 July 1915 : general Gramat
- 23 May 1916 : general Girodon, killed on reconnaissance in the Somme Bouchavesnes - Bois L'Abbé area 23 September 1916
- 23 September 1916 : general Brissaud-Desmaillets
- 19 April 1917 : general Penet
- 10 June 1918 - 23 décembre 1918 : general Chabord

=== Inter-war ===
- 12 January 1919 - 10 April 1923 : general Boichut
- 1 October 1931 - 16 November 1933 : general Colson
- 1 January 1936 : general Loizeau

=== World War II ===
- 1 April 1939 - 2 June 1940 : general Janssen

== Structure ==
=== World War I ===
- Infantry :

106th Line Infantry Regiment - August 1914 to January 1917
132nd Line Infantry Regiment - August 1914 to January 1917
350th Infantry Regiment - January 1917 to November 1918
54th Line Infantry Regiment - August 1914 to November 1918
67th Line Infantry Regiment - August 1914 to November 1918
26th Foot Chasseurs Regiment - January 1915 to June 1915
142nd Territorial Infantry Regiment - August 1918 to November 1918
173rd Infantry Regiment - 23 November 1914 to May 1915

- Cavalry:

One squadron of 12th Mounted Chasseurs Regiment - January 1917 to November 1918

- Artillery :

Three groups of 75 mm guns from 25th Artillery Regiment - August 1914 to November 1918
102nd Battery of 58 mm mortars from 46th Artillery Regiment - July 1916 to July 1917
102nd Battery of 58 mm mortars from 25th Artillery Regiment - July 1917 to January 1918
101st Battery of 58 mm mortars from 25th Artillery Regiment - January 1918 to November 1918
5th Group of 155c guns from 106th Artillery Regiment - July 1918 to November 1918

- Engineers:

One company from 9th Engineer Regiment

=== 1940 ===
It totalled around 26,000 men at full strength, consisting of:

- 150th Line Infantry Regiment from Verdun
- 106th Line Infantry Regiment from Châlons-sur-Marne and Reims
- 8th Zouave Regiment from Mourmelon
- 25th Artillery Regiment, equipped with 75 mm guns
- 225th Artillery Regiment, equipped with 155 mm court
- 3rd Infantry Divisional Reconnaissance Group (GRDI) from Épernay, with forty tanks
- all the divisional service troops (telegraphers, engineers, sappers, motor transport, sanitary troops and others)

== Bibliography (in French) ==
- Maurice Genevoix, Ceux de 14 (Sous Verdun, Nuits de Guerre, La Boue, Les Eparges), Paris, Éditions Flammarion, 1949
- Commandant R. de Fériet, La Crête des Éparges, 1914-1918, Paris, Payot, 1939, 210 p.
- AFGG, vol. 2, t. 10 : Ordres de bataille des grandes unités : divisions d'infanterie, divisions de cavalerie, 1924, 1092 p. (lire en ligne [archive]).
- La 12e DI dans la bataille de l'Aisne (1917)
