= 54th Infantry Regiment (France) =

- 54e régiment d’infanterie
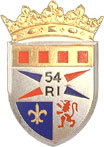
- Active: 1657 – Present
- Country: Kingdom of France (1657 - 1792); France (1792 - present)
- Branch: French Army
- Type: Infantry
- Role: Line infantry
- Size: Regiment
- Patron: Saint-Maurice
- Engagements: Seven Years' War; French Revolutionary Wars; Napoleonic Wars; World War I: Chemin des Dames offensive; World War II
- Decorations: Croix de guerre 1914-1918 with 3 citations in army orders 1 citation in army corps orders 1 citation in divisional orders il a right to wear the colours of the croix de guerre 1914–1918 on its forage cap.
- Battle honours: Valmy 1792; Alkmaar 1799; Austerlitz 1805; Friedland 1807; Kabylie 1857; La Marne 1914; Éparges 1915; Verdun 1916; L’Escaut 1918

The 54th Infantry Regiment (54e régiment d’infanterie or 54e RI) is a line infantry regiment of the French Army.

== History ==
=== Early service ===
It was formed in 1657 during the Ancien Régime as the régiment Mazarin-Catalans, being renamed the régiment Royal Catalan in 1661 then the régiment Royal Roussillon in 1667. The regiment was recruited in the regions of Perpignan, Roussillon and Catalonia. The regiment served at the Battle of Fontenoy in 1745 during the War of the Austrian Succession.

A second battalion of the Royal Roussillon served in Germany (1756–1762). In 1756, the 54th Infantry Regiment's uniform was white with blue facings, five gilded buttons for the linings and three buttons on each pocket. Its first battalion fought in Canada during the French and Indian War from 1756 to 1761, under the command of général Louis-Joseph de Saint-Veran, Marquis de Montcalm, with M. de Sennezergue as its colonel. The battalion arrived in New France in May 1756, and was originally posted to Montreal, with the exception of a detachment that was sent to Fort Carillon. It fought at the Battle of Fort William Henry. After that victory, the regiment took part in the 1758 Battle of Carillon. It then went to Quebec City to defend the city. At the Battle of the Plains of Abraham, it was broken and forced to flee by steady fire from the British 35th Foot, whose members are traditionally held to have picked up the 54th's plumes and placed them in their own headdress (the Roussillon Plume being formally incorporated into the badge of the 35th Foot in 1881).

The regiment participated in the battles of Montmorency, the Plains of Abraham and Sainte-Foy. At the subsequent siege of Quebec they were unable to subdue the garrison and had to retreat to Montreal. They could not fend off the British three pronged attack against Montréal in September and surrendered there.

=== Revolution and First Empire ===
In 1791, just before the French Revolution, it lost its royal title and first became the 54th Line Infantry Regiment, then in 1793 the 54e demi-brigade de bataille (consisting of the 1st Puy-de-Dôme Volunteers' Battalion and the 1st Indre Volunteers' Battalion). From 1796, it was made up of the 43e demi-brigade de bataille (itself made up of 1st battalion of the 22nd Line Infantry Regiment, 4th Seine-et-Oise Volunteers' Battalion, and the 3rd Lot Volunteers' Battalion). In 1803, it reverted to its title of 54th Line Infantry Regiment. Distinguished at Barossa and led the assault on Le Haye Sainte at Waterloo. One battalion was present in the Wagram campaign. Between 1804 and 1815, it lost 23 officers killed, 89 wounded and 14 died of wounds. During this period it fought at:

- 1792: Battle of Valmy and Battle of Jemappes.
- 1793: Battle of Kaiserslautern.
- 1794: Mainz – Battle of Mainz.
- 1799: Battle of Bergen, Battle of Alkmaar.
- 1800: Battle of Hohenlinden.
- 1805: Battle of Austerlitz.
- 1806: Crewitz and Battle of Lubeck.
- 1807: Battle of Ostrołęka and Battle of Friedland.
- 1808: Battle of Espinosa and Battle of Somosierra.
- 1809: Battle of Essling, Battle of Wagram, and Battle of Talavera-de-la-Reyna.
- 1810: Saint-Louis.
- 1811: Battle of Barossa, Battle of Fuentes de Oñoro, and Battle of Zujar.
- 1812: Siege of Tarifa and Siege of Cádiz.
- 1813: Oignon, Battle of Vitoria, Battle of Maya, Battle of Dresden, Battle of Leipzig, and Siege of Danzig.
- 1814: Battle of Bar-sur-Aube, Battle of Fère-Champenoise, and Maestricht.
- 1815: Battle of Waterloo.

=== 1815–1914 ===
It became a 'légion -Infanterie de ligne' from 1816 to 1820, reverting to 54th Line Infantry Regiment from 1820 to 1854 and finally taking its present name in 1854. From 1828 to 1833, it took part in the Morea expedition supporting Greek independence, especially the siege of the fort at Morea.

=== 1914–1918 ===
On the outbreak of the First World War in 1914, the Regiment was on garrison duties at Compiègne as part of France's 23rd Infantry Brigade, itself part of 12th Infantry Division (France) of 6th Army Corps, of which it formed part throughout the war. It took part in 3rd and 4th Armies' retreat, fighting from 5 to 13 September at Longwy, Vaux-Marie, Sommaisne, Rembercourt-aux-Pots, Mouilly and the First Battle of the Marne. It then fought in the Calonne (les Hauts de Meuse- Ouest des Eparges) sector of the trenches from 22 September 1914 to 2 August 1915. Les Eparges was a heavily disputed sector, split between the regiments of France's 12th Infantry Division.

From January to May 1915, it fought in operations on the River Meuse and Argonne, both in les Eparges and the First Battle of Champagne. On 24 April that year, the Regiment was brought together to campaign near Rupt-en-Woëvre – before going, it performed a march past the general commanding 12th Infantry Division, who then decorated two of the Regiment's officers with the Légion d’Honneur. The Regiment was then mentioned in dispatches for its sustained fighting from 26 December onwards, when the Regiment was put on alert at lunchtime and went on to base itself on the edge of the Châtelaine forest opposite Mouilly. On Sunday 25 April it linked up with France's 132nd Infantry Regiment on its left. Under German 105 and 150 bombardment, the 54th was ordered to make its trenches unwinnable. The 87th Infantry Regiment had to attack before the 54th but the attack failed and night arrived.

In 1916, the Regiment saw action at Verdun and the Somme and the following year during the Chemin des Dames offensive. 1918 saw it fighting once again in the Somme, this time at Grivesnes, le Plessier and the Saint-Aignan offensive on the Aisne, then finally in the Flanders offensive.

=== 1919–1923 ===
The regiment returned to its garrison at Compiègne in August 1919. The merger of the 54th Infantry Regiment into the 67th Infantry Regiment began in February 1923 and effective 1 April of that year the 54th ceased to exist.

=== World War II ===
The regiment was reestablished in early September 1939 as the 54th Fortress Infantry Regiment, from the 4th Battalion of the 43rd Infantry Regiment. The 54th Fortress Infantry Regiment was part of the Fortified Sector of the Escaut.

== Battle honours ==
The Regiment's tie is decorated with the Croix de guerre 1914-1918 with three citations in army orders, one citation in army corps orders and one citation in divisional orders. The Regiment has the right to wear the colours of the Croix on its forage cap. Its colours bear the battle honours:

== Colonels/chefs de brigade ==
- 1756: M. de Sennezergue – colonel
- 1792: Pierre-Michel-Joseph-Salomon Dumesnil – Colonel.
- 1794: Glinec – Chef de brigade.
- 1795: Sauvat – Chef de brigade.
- 1796: Louis-Prix Vare – Chef de brigade (*).
- 1803: Armand Philippon – Colonel (* *) – wounded 28 July 1809.
- 1810: Jacques Saint-Faust – Colonel – wounded 27 February 1814.
- 1814: Claude Charlet – Colonel.
- 1829: Félix-Louis de Narp.
- 1830: François Négrier.

(*) Officer who then became général de brigade, (* *) Officer who then became général de division

== See also ==
- François de Calvo
