= Namur-Suarlée Airfield =

Namur-Suarlée Airfield Aérodrome de Namur
- IATA: none; ICAO: EBNM

Summary
- Airport type: Private
- Operator: Aérodrome de Namur SA
- Serves: Namur, Wallonia, Belgium
- Location: Suarlée / Temploux
- Elevation AMSL: 586 ft / 179 m
- Coordinates: 50°29′17″N 004°46′08″E
- Website: aerodromedenamur.be

Map
- Location in Belgium

Runways
Direction	Length		Surface
Direction	m	ft	Surface
06L/24R	629	2,064	Grass
06R/24L	690	2,264	Asphalt
- Sources: Belgian AIP

Namur-Suarlée Airfield (ICAO: EBNM) is a regional aerodrome in Belgium, located at Suarlée and Temploux, 7 km (5 miles) west-northwest of Namur, in Namur Province, Wallonia. It is about 65 km (40 miles) southeast of Brussels.

It supports general aviation with no commercial airline service scheduled.

== History ==
The airfield was opened on 26 October 1944 by the United States Army Air Forces IX Engineering Command as a grass liaison airfield for use by the Det 112, 112th Liaison Squadron and its light observation aircraft to support the numerous command and control organizations in Namur. Designated as Advanced Landing Ground "Y-47". In February 1945 the airfield received a 3,450 ft (1,050 m) all-weather Pierced Steel Planking surface to allow operations during the winter of 1944–1945.

American military units remained in Namur until November 1945 before returning to the United States and the airfield was turned over to Belgian authorities. The metal runway was eventually removed and today a modern grass airfield is used by light aircraft and sailplanes.

In 2018, 06L/24R runway was converted from grass to asphalt.

In September 2019, Sonaca Aircraft inaugurated its assembly line of Sonaca 200.
