= Oran Division =

- Division d'Oran
- Algerian Tirailleurs of the Oran Division in 1896.
- Active: 1831–1964
- Disbanded: 1957 (1964)
- Country: France
- Branch: Army of Africa
- Type: Infantry
- Part of: 19th Army Region
- Garrison/HQ: Oran
- Engagements: French conquest of Algeria; World War II; Operation Torch; Tunisian campaign; Algerian War

The Oran Division (French: Division d'Oran) was an infantry division of the French Army, part of the 19th Army Corps based in French Algeria. It comprised troops from the Army of Africa garrisoned in the Oran region. It was disbanded in 1964.

== Creation and different names ==
- ?: Oran Division
- September 1939: disbanded, forms the infantry divisions of Africa
- 1940: recreated in the Armistice Army as Oran Territorial Division
- May 1943: becomes Oran Marching Division
- June 1943: disbanded
- February 1946: Oran Territorial Division
- March 1956: renamed Oran Military Division
- March 1957: renamed Oran Army Corps
- July 1962: renamed 24th Army Corps
- January 1963: becomes the 4th Division
- June 1964: 4th Division is disbanded

== History of garrisons, campaigns and battles ==
=== 1914–1939 ===
In 1914, the Oran division consisted of two brigades:

- 2nd Brigade of Algeria (Oran):
  - 2nd Zouave Regiment, at Oran,
  - 2^{e} régiment de tirailleurs algériens, at Mostaganem;
- 4th Brigade of Algeria (Tlemcen):
  - 1st Foreign Infantry Regiment, at Sidi Bel Abbès,
  - 2nd Foreign Infantry Regiment, at Saïda,
  - 1st Battalion of Light Infantry of Africa, at Marnia,
  - 6^{e} régiment de tirailleurs algériens, at Tlemcen.

In August 1939, the division was still organised with two brigades:

- 2nd Algerian Infantry Brigade (Oran):
  - 2nd Zouave Regiment, at Oran and Nemours,
  - one battalion of the 13^{e} régiment de tirailleurs sénégalais at Oran,
  - 1st Foreign Infantry Regiment, at Sidi Bel Abbès,
- 4th Algerian Infantry Brigade (Tlemcen):
  - 2^{e} régiment de tirailleurs algériens, at Mostaganem, Tiaret and Mascara;
  - 6^{e} régiment de tirailleurs algériens, at Tlemcen, Oran and Marnia.

=== World War II ===
On mobilisation, the division was disbanded. It set up the 82^{e} division d'infanterie d'Afrique.

It was recreated in 1940 as part of the Armistice Army. It was made up of the following units:

- 2th Infantry Brigade of Algeria (Oran):
  - 2^{e} régiment de zouaves, at Oran,
  - 2^{e} régiment de tirailleurs algériens, at Mostaganem, Oran and Tiaret;
- 4th Infantry Brigade of Algeria (Tlemcen):
  - 6^{e} régiment de tirailleurs algériens, at Tlemcen, Marnia and Nemours,
  - 3rd Battalion of the 1st Foreign Infantry Regiment, at Aïn Sefra,
  - Depot of the French Foreign Legion, at Sidi Bel Abbès;
- 2nd Cavalry Brigade of Algeria (Mascara):
  - 2^{e} régiment de spahis algériens, at Tlemcen and Colomb-Béchar,
  - 2^{e} régiment de chasseurs d'Afrique, at Oran,
  - 9^{e} régiment de chasseurs d'Afrique at Mascara;
- Artillery:
  - 66th Artillery Regiment of Africa at Oran,
  - 68th Artillery Regiment of Africa at Tlemcen, Sidi Bel Abbès and Mascara;
- 28th Train Squadron,
- Group of Squadrons of the 7th Legion of the Guard.

The Oran division opposed the American II Corps during Operation Torch. Then, from 15 November 1942, its elements were sent to the border of Tunisia, which had been invaded by the Axis. Its elements became the Oran marching division on 1 May 1943 at the start of the Allied Tunisian campaign. It was then made up of the following units :

- 2^{e} régiment de tirailleurs algériens,
- 6^{e} régiment de tirailleurs algériens,
- 15^{e} régiment de tirailleurs sénégalais,
- 1st Foreign Infantry Regiment,
- Artillery:
  - 1st and 3rd Groups of the 62nd Artillery Regiment of Africa,
  - 2nd Group of the 66th Artillery Regiment of Africa,
  - 1st Group of the 68th Artillery Regiment of Africa,
  - 411th Anti-Aircraft Group,
  - 412th Anti-Aircraft Group.

The Oran Marching Division stalled in front of El Fahs, which it took on 7 May 1943. It was then credited with encircling Djebel Oust on 9 May 1943 and Djebel Zaghouan on 13 May 1943. It was disbanded on 30 June 1943, with some of its elements joining the 8th Algerian Infantry Division.

Creation of the 8th Algerian Infantry Division

The division was formed on 24 June 1943 from the Oran Marching Division and comprised the following units:

- 2nd Algerian Tirailleurs Regiment
- 6th Algerian Tirailleurs Regiment
- 9^{e} régiment de zouaves
- 2nd Algerian Spahi Regiment
- 66th Artillery Regiment of Africa

Following the American refusal to deliver the division's equipment, it was disbanded on 1 November 1944.

=== After World War II ===
In 1946, the 19th Corps became the 10th Military Region. The Oran territorial division remained attached to it. It covered the arrondissements of Oran, Sidi Bel Abbès, Mascara, Mostaganem, Tiaret and Tlemcen. In January 1949, the Algiers division was reorganised: its headquarters were moved from Oran to Tlemcen to be closer to potential trouble spots.

On 17 March 1956, the Oran territorial division was renamed the Oran military division. At the end of summer 1956, the division was organised as follows:

- Aïn-Témouchet operational area (SOAT), with the 29th Infantry Division,
- Tlemcen operational area (ZOT), with the 12th Infantry Division and the 5th Armored Division,
- Operational Area Centre Oranie (SOCO), with the 13th Infantry Division,
- East Oranie operational sector with the 4th Motorised Infantry Division.

These operational sectors and zones did not overlap with the territorial subdivisions.

The military division, which no longer corresponded to a division in the tactical sense of the term, took the name of army corps on 8 March 1957. At the end of 1958, the Oran army corps was divided into four zones:

- West Oranais zone (ZOO), with the 12th Infantry Division (HQ in Tlemcen),
- Centre Oranais zone (ZCO), with the 29th Infantry Division (HQ in Misserghin) and the 13th Infantry Division (HQ in Sidi Bel Abbès),
- North Oranais zone (ZNO), with the 5th Armoured Division (HQ in Mostaganem),
- South Oranais zone (ZSO), with the 4th Motorised Infantry Division (HQ in Tiaret),
- Mécheria autonomous subdivision (SAM),
- Tactical Air Group (GATAC) No. 2 of the French Air Force.

After the generals' Algiers putsch of 1961, the 1st Intervention Brigade was created on 30 April 1961 and attached to the army corps.

In July 1962, the Algiers Army Corps (12th, 13th and 29th Infantry Divisions, 4th Motorised Infantry Division and Oran Autonomous Grouping) was renamed the 24th Army Corps. On 1 January 1963, the 24th Army Corps became the 2nd Division, with headquarters in Oran and then Arzew and three brigades, the 41st in Mostaganem, the 42nd in Oran and the 43rd in Mers El Kébir. The 51st Brigade, at Colomb-Béchar, was attached to it from 30 April 1963 until it was disbanded on 29 February 1964. The 20th Division was disbanded on 20 June 1964.

== Commanders ==
=== Oran Division ===
- 1838: general Guéhéneuc
- 1860–1869: general Deligny
- 1884–1893: general Détrie
- 1897: general de Ganay
- 1901: general Risbourg
- 1903–1906: general Herson
- 1908: general Lyautey
- 1934–1936: general Giraud
- 1936–1939: general Poupinel
- 1940: general Gibert
- 1940–1942: general Charbonneau
- 1942–1943: general Robert Boisseau
- 1948: general Cherrière
- 1951: general Lorillot
- 1956: general Gambiez

=== Oran Army Corps ===
- 1959: general Gambiez
- 1960: general de Pouilly
  - 1961: general Perotat (appointed by the putschists of the Algiers putsch of 1961 during the arrest of general de Pouilly)
- 1961: general Cantarel
- 1961–1962: general Ginestet
- 1962: general Katz (interim)
- 1962: general de Belenet

== Sources and bibliography ==
- Sarmant, Thierry; Schillinger, Philippe; Hardy, Michel (2000). Inventaire de la série H, sous-série 1 H1091-4881 : Algérie 1945-1967 (PDF). Château de Vincennes: Service historique de l'Armée de terre. ISBN 2-86323-129-4. ISSN 1269-7397..
