= 8th Infantry Division (France) =

- French: 8e Division d'Infanterie, 8e DI
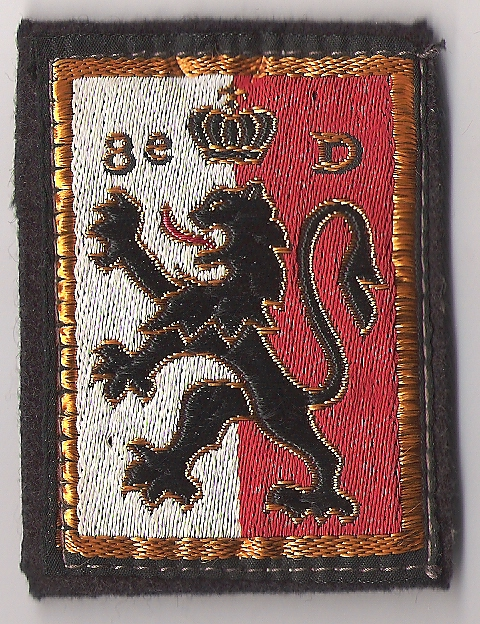
- Active: 1914–1993
- Country: France
- Branch: French Army
- Type: Infantry
- Size: Division
- Garrison/HQ: Verdun
- Engagements: World War I: Battle of the Ardennes; First Battle of the Marne; First Battle of the Aisne; First Battle of Picardy; First Battle of Champagne; Second Battle of Champagne; Battle of Verdun; 4th Battle of Champagne; Hundred Days Offensive; World War II: Battle of France; Cold War

The 8th Infantry Division (French: 8e Division d'Infanterie, 8e DI) was a French Army formation during World War I, World War II and the Cold War. It was dissolved in 1993.

== World War I ==
The 8th Infantry Division was a part of the 4th Army Corps at the start of the war. At various times it included the 115th, 117th, 124th, 130th, 311th Infantry Regiments, as well as the 34th Territorial Infantry Regiment.

It initially formed part of the garrison of the Verdun fortress and was subordinated to the French 3rd Army, and in the first year of fighting participated in the Battle of the Ardennes, the First Battle of the Marne (including the Battle of the Ourcq), the First Battle of the Aisne and the First Battle of Picardy. In 1915 it participated in the First and Second Battle of Champagne. In 1916, it participated in the Battle of Verdun and the Battle of the Observatories. 1917 saw the division mainly involved in holding the front line, but 1918 saw the division participating in the 4th Battle of Champagne.

At various times, it was part of the French First Army, French Second Army, French Third Army, French Fourth Army, French Fifth Army, French Sixth Army and French Tenth Army.

== World War II ==
During the Battle of France in May 1940 the division was made up of the following units:

- 142nd Infantry Regiment
- 237th Infantry Regiment
- 12th Foreign Infantry Regiment
- 42nd Reconnaissance Battalion
- 82nd Artillery Regiment
- 282nd Artillery Regiment

It was a newly created division. The 12th Foreign Infantry Regiment was mainly made up of Spanish Republican Soldiers who had fled to France after the Spanish Civil War. The other regiments were made up of reservists.

== Cold War 1977-93 ==
The 8th Motorised Infantry Brigade was absorbed by the 7th Light Armoured Division, creating the 7th Armoured Division in 1963. In 1977, the 7th Armoured Division was dissolved and its component units were used to create a new 7th Armoured Division, a 4th Armoured Division, and the 8th Infantry Division. The new division had its headquarters at Amiens and formed part of III Corps. In 1985 the division consisted of the 8th Infantry Regiment (8 RI) (Véhicule de l'Avant Blindé wheeled personnel carriers) (Noyon), the 94th Infantry Regiment (France) (VAB) (Sissonne), the 67th Infantry Regiment (VAB) (Soissons), the 7 RCh (AML) (Arras), the 41st Marine Artillery Regiment (former Coloniale), the 8 Compagnie de Genie, and the 8 RCS (Amiens). The division was dissolved in 1993.

== See also ==
- Achille Pierre Deffontaines
