= 10th Armoured Division (France) =

The 10th Armoured Division (French: 10e division blindée) was a former unit of the French Army. Created in 1977, it was disbanded in 1997.

== History ==
The 10th Armoured Division was created on 1 August 1977 at Châlons-en-Champagne (part of Châlons-sur-Marne (at that time)). It formed part of the 1st Army Corps.

The general commanding the 10th Armored Division was also responsible for the 63rd Territorial Military Division (French: 63e division militaire territoriale). With approximately 8,000 men and 148 AMX-30 battle tanks, its composition was as follows:

- 1st groupe de chasseurs in Reims
- 150th Infantry Regiment in Verdun
- 10th compagnie anti-chars in Verdun
- 4th Dragoon Regiment in Mourmelon
- 503rd Combat Tank Regiment in Mourmelon
- 10th Divisional Reconnaissance Squadron in Mourmelon
- 40th Artillery Regiment in Suippes
- 3rd Engineer Regiment in Charleville-Mézières
- 10th Command and Support Regiment in Châlons

In 1984, it joined the 3rd Army Corps. The modèle 1984 armored division format made it a combined arms unit with a strength of approximately 10,000 men.

On 31 August 1997, as part of the professionalization of the armed forces, the headquarters of the 10th Armored Division merged with that of the 2nd Armored Division, and the 10th Armored Division was disbanded. It then comprised:

- 16th groupe de chasseurs in Saarburg, Germany - transferred to the 2nd Armored Division
- 151st Infantry Regiment in Verdun - disbanded
- 10th compagnie anti-chars in Verdun - disbanded
- 2nd Chasseur Regiment in Verdun - transferred to the 7th Armored Division
- 501st-503rd Combat Tank Regiment in Mourmelon - transferred to the 2nd Armored Division
- 10th Divisional Reconnaissance Squadron in Mourmelon - transferred to the 2nd Armored Division
- 8th Artillery Regiment in Commercy - transferred to the 7th Armored Division
- 3rd Engineer Regiment in Charleville-Mézières - transferred to the 2nd Armored Division
- 10th Command and Support Regiment in Châlons - transferred to the 2nd Armored Division
