= 60th Infantry Division (France) =

The 60th Infantry Division (French: 60e Division d'Infanterie, 60e DI) was a French Army formation during World War I and World War II.

== World War 1 ==
During World War I, the division comprised:

- 202nd Infantry Regiment
- 225th Infantry Regiment
- 247th Infantry Regiment (to March 1917)
- 248th Infantry Regiment
- 271st Infantry Regiment (to June 1916)
- 336th Infantry Regiment (to June 1916)
- 28th Territorial Infantry Regiment (from August 1918)

It was part of the French 1st, 4th, 6th, 8th, 10th, 11th, 12th, 13th, 15th, 21st, 30th, 31st, 35th, 2nd Colonial, 2nd Cavalry Corps, during which it participated in the Battle of the Ardennes, the First Battle of the Marne, the First Battle of the Aisne, the First Battle of Champagne, the Battle of the Lys, and the Meuse-Argonne Offensive.

At various times, it was part of the French First Army, French Second Army, French Third Army, French Fourth Army, French Fifth Army, French Sixth Army, French Seventh Army and French Ninth Army

== World War 2 ==
During the Battle of France in May 1940 the division was made up of the following units:

- 241st Infantry Regiment
- 270th Infantry Regiment
- 271st Infantry Regiment
- 68th Reconnaissance Battalion
- 50th Artillery Regiment

It was a Series B Reserve division containing older reservists.
