= François Négrier =

François Négrier may refer to:

- General François-Marie-Casimir Négrier (1788–1848)
- General François Oscar de Négrier (1839–1913)
