= 4th Armoured Division (France, 1967) =

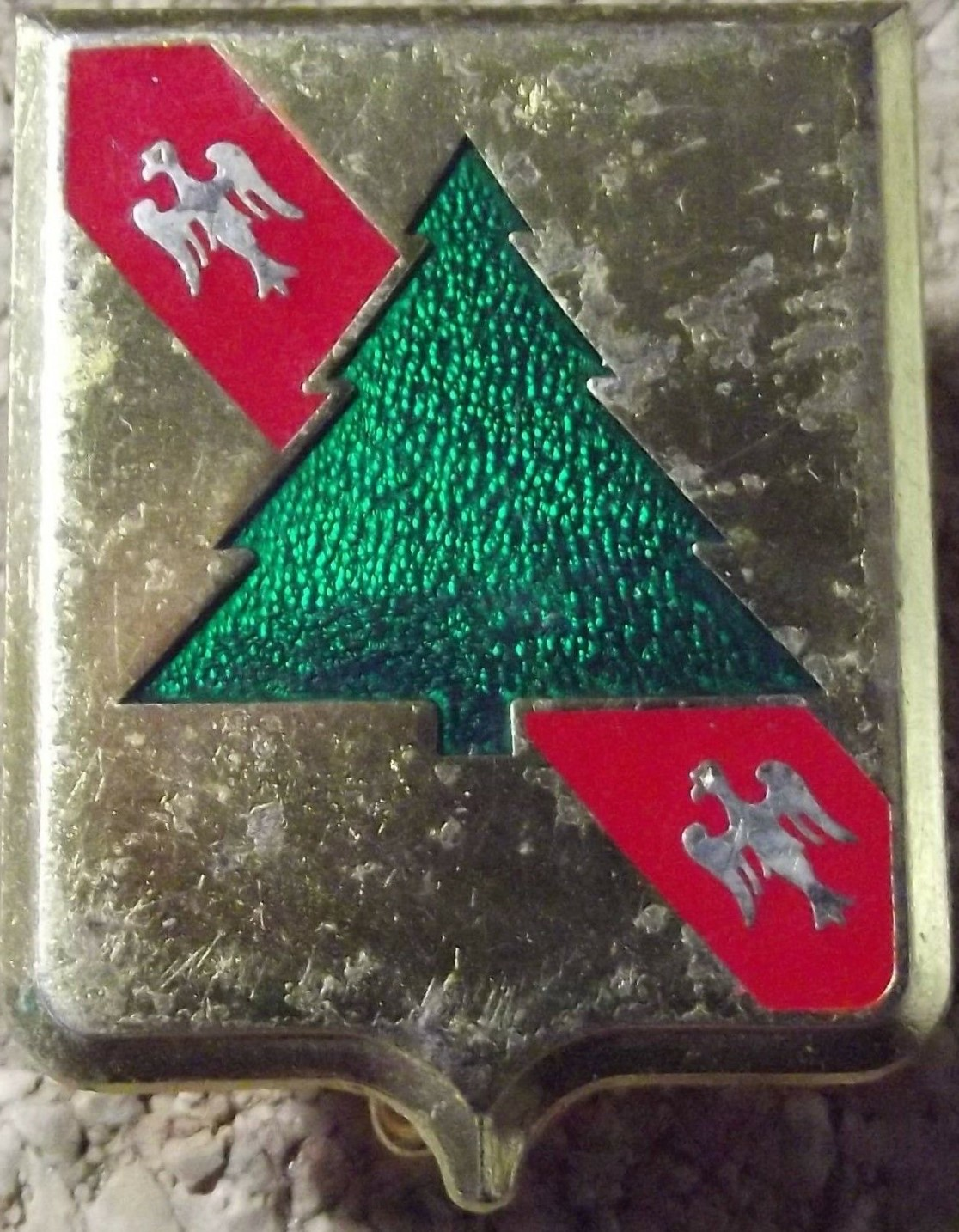

The 4th Armoured Division was an armoured division of the French Army formed on 1 September 1967. It should not be confused with the 4e Division cuirassée, a French armored division that saw service in the 1940 campaign.

Initially the 4th Armoured Division had its headquarters at Verdun, and on 1 June 1968, the 3rd Engineer Regiment (3e régiment du genie) at Mézières came under the division's command.

After the small-divisions reorganisation of 1977, in which three-brigade divisions were reduced to about five manoeuvre battalions each, its headquarters moved to Nancy (4 RCS). Also on 31 July 1977, with the dissolution of the 8th Brigade of the 7th Armoured Division, the 30e GC was transferred to the 4th Armoured Division, which comprised the 30 GC, 151 RI, 170 RI, 3 RC, 2 RCh, l'escadron d'éclairage 4ème DB (Nancy), 8 RA, 61 RA, and 6th Engineer Regiment, at Caserne Verneau, Angers.

Through most of this period it had been part of the 1st Army Corps, itself part of the First Army. On 1 July 1985 it was disbanded and its headquarters core, including 4 RCS, used to form 4th Airmobile Division, which became part of the Rapid Action Force.
