= 3rd Army Corps (France) =

3e Corps d'Armée
- Active: 1871–1940; 1979–1998
- Country: France
- Branch: French Army
- Type: Corps
- Part of: First Army (Cold War)
- Engagements: World War I World War II

The 3rd Army Corps (French: 3e Corps d'Armée) was a corps-sized military formation of the French Army. It was formed in 1873, fought during both World War I and World War II, and was active after World War II until finally being disbanded on 1 July 1998.

The French Army also had an Army Corps of that name in 1805-1809 (renamed the Army of Aragon), as part of the Armée d'Italie in 1859 (disbanded later the same year) and in 1870 for the Franco-Prussian War (captured in its entirety later that year).

== Cold War ==
Reformed at Ste Germain-en-Laye on 1 July 1979 under the orders of Général de Barry, with its HQ fused with HQ 1st Military Region. Its major units were 2nd Armored Division and 8th Infantry Division (8 DI). On 1 July 1979 the Corps was transferred to Lille and its HQ fused with HQ 2nd Military Region. In 1991 the functions were separated, and Generals Arnold, Vaujour, Billot, and Heinrich held command as commanders of 3rd Corps solely. With its transfer to Lille, the corps took control of a force of 50,000 personnel including reservists, with 380 AMX-30, 1,300 armoured vehicles, 106 artillery pieces, and 56 Roland anti-aircraft missiles.

In 1984 the 6th Engineers Regiment joined the corps. At the end of the 1980s, the Corps comprised three major formations, the 2nd and 10th Armoured Divisions and the 8th DI. There was also a logistics brigade stationed at Beauvais. On 1 July 1990, with the promulgation of the ‘Armées 2000’ plan, the 3rd Army Corps became the only army corps in the metropolitan territory, and the 7th Armored Division joined it, with the grouping rising to 44,000 men with 15,000 vehicles.

In 1993, after the disbandment of the 8th DI, the Corps was reorganised to include three armoured divisions, the 2nd, 7th, and 10th, the 12th Light Armoured Division with its command post at Saumur, the 15th Infantry Division at Limoges, and the 3rd Logistics Brigade, all reporting to Corps HQ at Lille. On 1 July 1993 three specialist brigades, engineer, artillery, and signals, were created at Lille. In 1994, the 27th DIA left the FAR to rejoin the 3rd Corps as the 27th DIM.

In February 1996 the President of the Republic decided on a transition to a professional service force, and as part of the resulting changes, ten regiments were dissolved in 1997. The specialist brigades were transferred on 1 July 1997 to Lunéville (signals), Haguenau (the artillery brigade) and Strasbourg (engineers). The 2nd Armoured Division left Versailles on 1 September 1997 and was installed at Châlons-en-Champagne in place of the disbanding 10th Armoured Division. On 5 March 1998, in view of the ongoing structural adoptions of the French Army, the Minister of Defence decided to disband 3rd Corps, and the dissolution became effective 1 July 1998. The headquarters transitioned to become Headquarters Commandement de la force d'action terrestre (CFAT) (the Land Forces Action Command).

== Commanders ==
- 1859 - 1862 : Maréchal Certain de Canrobert
- 1862 - 1864 : Maréchal de Mac Mahon
- 1864 - 1867 : Maréchal Forey
- 1867 - 1869 : Maréchal Bazaine
- 1869 - 1869 : Maréchal Bazaine
- 1873 - 1879 : Général Lebrun
- 1879 - 1881 : Général Borel
- 1911 - 1914 : Général Valabrègue
- 1914 - 1915 : Général Hache
- 1915 - 1916 : Général Nivelle
- 1916 - 1919 : Général Lebrun
- 1919 - 1921 : Général Naulin
- 1921 - 1924 : Général Duchêne
- .
- 1939 - 1940 : Général de Fornel de La Laurencie
- .
- 20 February 1945 - 18 August 1945 : Général Leclerc
- 4 September 1945 - 5 November 1945 : Général de Larminat
- .
- General Jacques Antoine de Barry (1979–1980)
- General Alain Bizard (1983–1985)

== Sources ==
- Terre Magazine No.95, June/July 1998, p. 26-7

== See also ==
- Third Army (France)
