= 6th Army Corps (France) =

- 6e corps d'armée
- Active: 1873–1940
- Country: France
- Branch: French Army
- Type: Army corps
- Part of: Third Army (May 1940)
- Engagements: World War I Battle of France

Commanders
- Current commander: General Lucien Loizeau (1939–1940)

The 6th Army Corps (French: 6e corps d'armée) was a corps-level formation of the French Army that saw active service during both World War I and World War II. In May 1940, during the Battle of France, it was part of the Third Army under Group d'Armees 2, Army Group 2.

== History ==
The corps was established in 1873 and was headquartered in Châlons-sur-Marne. From that time it was responsible for the Ardennes, Marne, and Meurthe-et-Moselle.

From 1873 to 1914 it included the 12th Infantry Division (Reims, 6e Region Militaire); 40th (Saint-Mihiel); and 42nd Infantry Division (Verdun), the 6th Cavalry Brigade, and the 6th Artillery Brigade.

It was responsible for fortified places at Reims; Verdun, and Chalons-sur-Marne.

After the First World War it remained responsible for the Ardennes, Marne, and Meurthe-et-Moselle.

=== World War II (1939–1940) ===
During the mobilization in September 1939, the 6th Army Corps was placed under the command of General Lucien Loizeau. Positioned on the Maginot Line, the corps held defensive sectors in Lorraine. During the German offensive in May 1940, the corps remained primarily in its fortified positions until the general retreat was ordered in mid-June. General Loizeau was taken prisoner on 20 June 1940.

== Structure ==
The 6th Army Corps was a Série A formation. As an active frontline corps, it maintained a high proportion of active-duty personnel (cadres d'active) and was prioritized for modern equipment; notably, its 42nd Infantry Division maintained 100% of its authorized strength at the start of the campaign.

The corps' operational framework relied on the four functional pillars of the Corps Troops (Éléments Organiques de Corps d'Armée - EOCA):

- Infantry and Protection (Infanterie et Protection): The 606th Pioneer Regiment (606e Régiment de Pionniers) was tasked with fortifying rear areas and securing corps infrastructure.
- Artillery and Logistics (Artillerie et Train): Heavy firepower was provided by the 103rd Heavy Horse-Drawn Artillery Regiment (103e RALH), utilizing 105mm L and 155mm GPF batteries, supported by the Corps Artillery Park (Parc d'Artillerie) and the logistical assets of the transport branch (Train).
- Engineering (Génie): Specialized Sapper-Miner companies (Sapeurs-Mineurs 106/1 & 106/2) and bridging assets (Équipage de Ponts 106/16) facilitated tactical movement.
- Communications (Transmissions): Command and control were ensured by dedicated Telegraphic (106/81) and Radio (106/82) companies.

This organization followed the French doctrine of the "Methodical Battle" (Bataille conduite), where the corps acted as the central tactical and administrative frame to coordinate its divisions and attached Fortified Sectors (Secteurs Fortifiés).

== Order of Battle (May 1940) ==
According to the records of the SHAT and contemporary mobilization documents, the corps was structured as follows:

=== Corps Troops (Éléments Organiques de Corps d'Armée) ===
- Infantry: 606th Pioneer Regiment (606e Régiment de Pionniers)
- Cavalry: 8th Corps Reconnaissance Group (8e GRCA)
- Artillery: 103rd Heavy Horse-Drawn Artillery Regiment (103e RALH)
- Engineering: 106/1 & 106/2 Sapper-Miner Companies, 106/16 Bridging Company, 106/21 Engineering Park Company
- Communications: 106/81 Telegraphic, 106/82 Radio, and 106/83 Pigeon Detachments
- Services and Logistics: 106/6 Operating Service Group, 206/6 Butcher Company, 6th Horse-Drawn Ambulance, 206th Light Surgical Ambulance

=== 42nd Infantry Division (42e Division d'Infanterie) ===
42nd Infantry Division (Click "show" to expand)
- Infantry Regiments: 80th, 94th, and 151st Infantry Regiments (80e, 94e, 151e RI)
- Artillery: 61st Field Artillery Regiment (61e RAD), 261st Heavy Artillery Regiment (261e RAL), and 10th Divisional Anti-Tank Battery
- Attached Fortress Units: 161st & 162nd Fortress Infantry Regiments (RIF), 23rd Artillery Regiment (F), 53rd (mot) Machine Gun Battalion

=== 26th Infantry Division (26e Division d'Infanterie) ===
26th Infantry Division (Click "show" to expand)
- Infantry Regiments: 86th, 98th, and 105th Infantry Regiments (86e, 98e, 105e RI)
- Artillery: 36th Field Artillery Regiment (36e RAD), 236th Heavy Artillery Regiment (236e RAL), and 10th Divisional Anti-Tank Battery
- Attached Assets: 2/153rd, 3/153rd, and 4/153rd Artillery Regiments (F)

=== Fortified Sector of Boulay ===
- Subsector of Burtoncourt: 162e RIF, 23rd Armored Battalion (23e BCC), 3/423rd Pioneer Regiment
- Subsector of Tromborn: 161e RIF, 153rd Artillery Regiment (F)
- Subsector of Narbefontaine: 160e RIF
