= 4th Army Corps (France) =

The 4th Army Corps of the French Army was reformed in 1873 at Le Mans under Général Édouard-Jean-Étienne Deligny, after being surrounded and taken prisoner in the siege of Metz (1870).

== World War I ==
On mobilisation in 1914, it came under control of the Third Army and comprised the 7th and 8th Infantry Divisions.

The 7th Infantry Division consisted of the 13th Brigade with the 101st and 102nd Infantry Regiments and the 14th Inf Bde with the 103rd and 104th Infantry Regiments. Also part of the Division was a squadron of the 14th Régiment de hussards, the 25e régiment d'artillerie de campagne, and the 1st Engineer Regiment.

The 8th Infantry Division had the 15th Brigade (124th and 130th Infantry Regts) and the 16th Brigade (115th and 117th Infantry Regiments) plus the 31e régiment de hussards. Corps units included the 315th and 317th Infantry Regiments, 14e régiment de hussards, 44e régiment d'artillerie de campagne and the 6e régiment du génie.

The 60th Infantry Division also came under the command of the corps during the war. Commanders of the Corps were

- 1911–1915 : Général Boëlle
- 1915–1917 : Général Putz
- 1918–1919 : Général Pont

After the war, from 11 to 20 February 1919, it was commanded by General Marie Jean Auguste Paulinier.

== World War II ==
During the 1940 Battle of France, the 4th Army Corps was part of the French First Army Group's First Army, and included the 32nd Infantry Division. On 10 May 1940 corps headquarters was at Le Cateau under General de corps d'armee Boris; 15th Infantry Division headquarters was at Chauny.

On 7 August 1941, General Doyen was the Head of the French Mission, Armistice Commission at Wiesbaden, Germany. He promptly retired upon this assignment. At some time in 1942 he was arrested. It was around the time that the Allies invaded French North Africa and Germany responded by occupying the whole of France.

On 6 June 1944, the Allies invaded Normandy, France; shortly after French Troops under Jean Lattre De Tassigny invaded the coast of Provence in south of France. Paris was liberated on by 25 August and General DeGaulle was reforming the French Military for the invasion of Germany. De Gaulle was very keen on France playing a major role in the war; as a result General Doyen was recalled to service on 1 Feb 1945. General Doyen's first assignment was to be the Inspector General of Mountain Troops along the Franco-Italian border on 21 March 1945; it was under this command that the French 27th Alpine Division was assigned. In general the French divisions on the Franco-Italian border were grouped into the French Alpine Army and invaded northern Italy. Since Italy invaded France in 1940 and since German troops were on the Italian side of the Franco-Italian border De Gaulle order General Doyen to invade Italy. His army advanced attacking border fortification and taking Cuneo; Valle d'Aosta; Tende; several troops swept into the Italian Riviera and advancing as far as Imperia. Other elements of General Doyen's Alpine Army troops marched as far as Turin, Italy where they met up with American and Brazilian troops coming from the southeast.

On 15 March 1946, General Doyen was given the command of French Army's IV Corps and shortly after he was made the Military Governor of Lyon, France, only to retire from the military later in 1946.

=== Composition ===
- 1st Infantry Division (motorised)
- 15th Infantry Division (motorised)
- 7th Groupe de Reconnaissance de Corps d'Armée
- 106th Artillery Regiment (France) (Horse)
- 604th Régiment de Pionniers

Lieutenant General Paul-Andre Doyen commanded the corps in 1945–46.
