= Marie Jean Auguste Paulinier =

French World War I general

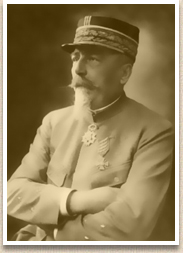
- Paulinier in 1915
- Born: September 26, 1861; Strasbourg, Bas-Rhin, France
- Died: December 6, 1927 (aged 66); El Biar, Alger, France
- Alma mater: École spéciale militaire de Saint-Cyr
- Military career
- Allegiance: France
- Branch: French Army
- Service years: 1880–1923
- Rank: Général de Division
- Commands: 19th Army Corps; 4th Army Corps
- Conflicts: World War I: Somme Offensive; Battle of the Somme

Marie Jean Auguste Paulinier (September 26, 1861 – December 6, 1927) was a French general who held many different commands and most notable for commanding the VI Corps during World War I.

== Biography ==
Paulinier began his military career by entering the École spéciale militaire de Saint-Cyr in 1880 and graduating in 1882 in the Class of Kroumirs, ranking 65th. His career before World War I is unknown but he was a member of the Chief of Staff of the 10th Army Corps from January 9, 1913 to November 11, 1914 and promoted to Colonel on March 23, 1914. Paulinier was then temporarily promoted to Brigadier General on October 26, 1914 before being fully promoted on April 20, 1915. Around this time, he was given command of the 62nd Infantry Regiment from November 11, 1914 to November 15, 1914 before being transferred to the 12th Infantry Division from November 15, 1914 to July 24, 1915. Around this time, Paulinier participated at the Battle of the Somme and given command of the VI Corps during the battle. On July 24, he was temporarily promoted to Général de Division and given command of the 6th Army Corps from July 24, 1915 to December 17, 1916. Around 1916, Paulinier was awarded the Order of St Michael and St George as a Knight Commander. On December 17, 1916, he was given command of the 40th Army Corps until February 11, 1919.

After the war, Paulinier would continue serving in the French Army as the commander of the 4th Army Corps from February 11, 1919 to February 20 and the 20th Army Corps from February 24, 1919 to November 9, 1920 while being stationed at Nancy. His final command was commanding the 19th Army Corps from November 9, 1920 to September 26, 1923 before being placed on the reserves and not long after, retiring from military service.

== Awards ==
- Legion of Honor, Knight (July 10, 1896)
- Legion of Honor, Officer (October 12, 1914)
- Legion of Honor, Commander (April 1, 1917)
- Legion of Honor, Grand Officer (June 16, 1920)
- Croix de guerre 1914–1918, 4 Palms
- 1914–1918 Inter-Allied Victory medal
- Commemorative Medal of the 1914–1918 War
- Overseas Medal

=== Foreign Awards ===
- Italy: Order of the Crown of Italy, Grand Cross
- United Kingdom: Order of the Bath, Knight Commander
- United Kingdom: Order of Saint Michael and Saint George, Knight Commander
- United States: Distinguished Service Medal
