= François de Calvo =

Comte of Calvo

- Count of Calvo, Governor of Aire
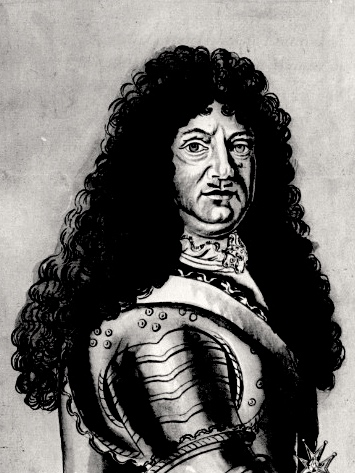
- Portrait of François de Calvo circa 1688

- Coat of arms
- Tenure: 1640 – 1690
- Full name: Joan Salvador de Calvó
- Other names: Calvo the Brave
- Years active: 1640–1690
- Born: July 28, 1625; Barcelona (Spain)
- Died: May 29, 1690 (age 64); Deinze (Netherlands)
- Wars and battles: Thirty Years War Reapers' War Franco-Dutch War War of the Reunions War of the League of Augsburg Lérida (1646) Saint-Gothard (1664) Maastricht (1673) Seneffe (1674) Maastricht (1676)
- Noble family: Calvo
- Spouse: Marie de Margarit
- Heir: François de Calvo
- Father: Josep de Calvo
- Mother: Jerónima de Gualbes
- Occupation: Lieutenant-General of the King's Armies

François de Calvo, comte de Calvo, baptized in Barcelona on July 28, 1625, and died in Deinze on May 29, 1690, was a French gentleman and soldier of Catalan origin in the 17th century. Born into a good Catalan family, he chose to join the French army at a time when the Reaper War was raging. After serving for a time in the infantry, he switched to the cavalry, becoming captain of the Aguilar cavalry regiment in 1647. He raised a regiment and became a mestre de camp in 1654.

A remarkable soldier, Calvo took part in all the campaigns of Louis XIV's reign, notably in Catalonia and Holland. He was promoted to brigadier in the king's armies in 1674. A general esteemed by the king for his efficiency, he was finally made lieutenant-general of the armies in 1676 following his intrepid defense of Maastricht. He was made a knight of the king's orders shortly before he died in 1688.

== Family origins ==
François de Calvo Gualbes was born in Barcelona, (Note: His exact date of birth is not certain; it's possible that he was born on the day of his baptism, July 28, 1625, but it's also very common to find 1628, and more rarely 1617. It is unlikely, however, that he was born in 1617, given that his father was born in 1599.) not Soldeu in Andorra, as some authors claim. He was baptized on July 28, 1625, in the church of Saints-Just-et-Pasteur in Barcelona under the name Joan Salvador de Calvó i Gualbes. At his confirmation, he took the first name François. He was the son of don Josep de Calvo, the second of the name, and doña Jerónima de Gualbes, his wife. He was a Catalan gentleman from a prestigious family whose ancestors commanded the defense of Barcelona against Moorish raids on several occasions, notably when Almanzor sacked the city in 985. He also counts Almogavres among his ancestors.

His father, Josep de Calvo i Puigesteve, honorary citizen of Barcelona, was a doctor of law, a member of the Council of Aragon and the Royal Audience of Catalonia, and was elected military consul in 1640, along with Aloisio Roca. His nobility was confirmed when he was admitted to the Corts Catalanes on May 14, 1622, and, as such, recorded in the Green Book of the Military Order of Catalonia. (Note: In the Iberian Peninsula, green books are genealogical tax books that list noble lineages. In Catalonia, there are three: the brazo militar (nobility), the brazo eclesiástico (clergy) and the brazo real (thirds).) His mother descended from a powerful family of Barcelona nobility, which provided the city with a large number of chief councilors.

François de Calvo has an older sister and two younger brothers: Jéromine, Joseph, and Pierre. The first married Raphaël Antich. The second was also a soldier. The third was an ecclesiastic: he was made abbot of Notre-Dame d'Eu by Louis XIV when the siege of Maastricht was lifted in 1676 thanks to the exploits of his brother François; Pierre de Calvo was also honorary councilor to the sovereign council of Roussillon and archdeacon of Elne. His nephew, Benoît de Calvo Bassedes, son of Joseph, became colonel of the Royal Regiment and brigadier in 1693.

== Military career ==
=== Rallying to France ===
Since the beginning of the Thirty Years' War, Castilian soldiers have been omnipresent in Catalonia, and the local population has had a relatively difficult time of it. In 1640, the Catalans revolted against their legitimate sovereign, the King of Spain. François de Calvo, still a teenager, witnessed this great upheaval. By 1641, the traditional Catalan elite could no longer control the peasants' revolt: unable to stabilize the situation and faced with the advance of Castilian troops, they appealed to France. Richelieu immediately seized the opportunity to weaken Philip IV of Spain. After the victory at Montjuïc, the Calvos, like many Catalan aristocrats, sided with France. François de Calvo was no exception and, despite his young age, offered his services to the new French governor of Catalonia, Joseph de Margarit, Marquis d'Aguilar. From then on, he faithfully served the Most Christian King.

=== Reaper War ===
Calvo began his career with the troops of Marshal de la Mothe. He took part in the storming of Tamarit in 1642, and the rescue operations at Flix, Miravet, and Cadaqués in 1643. He was part of the army that raised the siege of Lérida in 1644 and witnessed the bitter defeat that cost Marshal de la Mothe his post as Viceroy of Catalonia. Under the command of Comte d'Harcourt, he took part in the battles of Llorens and Balaguer in 1645 and the siege of Lérida in 1646. He earned his captain's stripes in the Margarit cavalry regiment when it was created on January 6, 1647. Under the orders of the Grand Condé, he served in the attack on Lérida and the siege of Tortosa in 1647. In 1648, as a reward for his services and loyalty to the King of France, the barony of Calonge - including, in addition to the town, the lands of Vall-llobrega and Vila-romà - was detached from the county of Palamós for him. Calvo proved to be a brilliant officer, and on October 14, 1651, Marshal de la Mothe obtained the rank of marshal de camp for him from the court. Calvo was judged to be too close to Margarit, and on January 3, 1652, the patent was revoked, officially on the complaints of senior officers who had not yet obtained the rank. A man close to Josep d'Ardena, Margarit's political rival, was appointed in his place.

He played an active role in the defense of Barcelona in 1652, but after the victory of the Spanish forces, he watched helplessly as French domination of Catalonia came to an end. To compensate for the loss of his Catalan properties, on June 18, 165313, he was given the possessions of Antoine de Perapertusa, Viscount of Joch, a Roussillon supporter of Spain who had fled to Barcelona. He did not lose hope, however, and continued to resist the Spanish troops, managing to dissuade them from laying siege to Roses in the summer of 1653. He proved his courage during the siege of Gerona and the battle of Bordilly. On March 13, 1654, he obtained from the king the right to raise a cavalry regiment in his name and became mestre de camp. With his new regiment, he took part in several military campaigns in Catalonia and Conflent, including the battles of Villefranche-de-Conflent, Puycerda, Cadaqués and Castellon. He remained in this post until peace was restored in 1659 with the signing of the Treaty of the Pyrenees.

=== Revolutionary War ===
His regiment was disbanded on July 20, 1660. Retaining his company as Mestre de camp, he served for a time in Italy and, in 1664, was one of the French troops sent by Louis XIV to help the Holy Roman Empire in Hungary against the Turks. He took part in the Battle of Saint-Gothard, where he once again distinguished himself by his bravery3. His regiment was re-established on December 7, 1665, to commemorate his action, and he was made a brigadier in the king's armies by a patent dated May 12, 1667.

The War of Devolution broke out a few days later, and Calvo was placed under the command of Marshal d'Aumont. They successfully advanced into Flanders, taking the town of Bergues on June 6 and Furnes six days later. He is dispatched to support the King, who lays siege to Tournai. After that, he took part in the conquests of Courtrai and Audenarde in July. He also took part in the conquest of Franche-Comté once the Flanders campaign was over. With the return of peace, his regiment was disbanded again on May 24, 1668, but the king retained his company of mestre de camp. His regiment was definitively re-established on August 9, 1671, and he was created visitor of the cavalry on November 6.

=== Dutch War ===
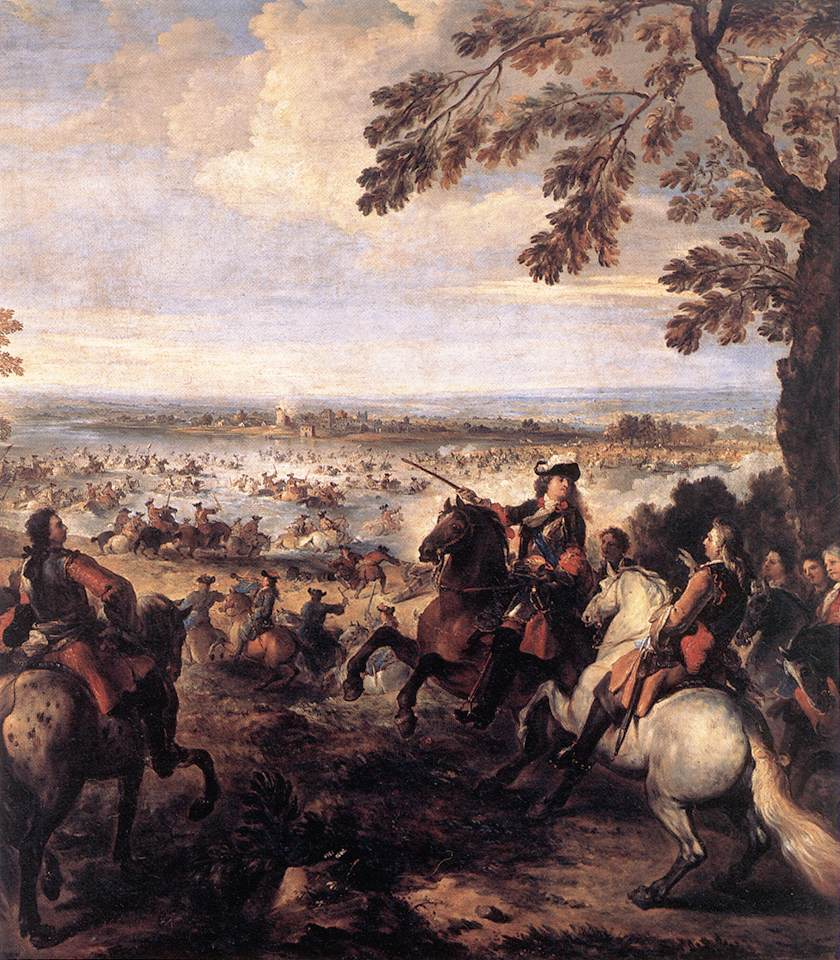
Louis XIV's army crosses the Rhine, by Joseph Parrocel, Musée du Louvre.

In 1672, he accompanied the king on the Dutch campaign. Fearless, he was one of the first to cross the Rhine. The king took a liking to him and made him governor of Arnhem on September 8, 1672. He took part in all the sieges that the king carried out in person. He spent the winter in the province of Utrecht and contributed to the lifting of the siege of Woerden and the capture of Bodegraven.

In 1673, he served under the Prince de Condé, then the Duke of Luxembourg, with whom he captured Maastricht. In 1674, at the battle of Seneffe, he distinguished himself by his bravery. Louis XIV said on this occasion: "I have four men whom my enemies respect: Montal, Chamilly, Calvo and Dufay". He also marched to the rescue of Oudenaarde. Seconded by Marshal d'Estrades, Governor of Maastricht, he laid siege to and took the town of Saint-Vith, making a substantial haul and dismantling the place in six hours. In early 1675, he was employed in Lorraine under the Marquis de Rochefort. He was definitively made maréchal de camp by patent of April 2, 1675.

He moved to the Flanders army in May and was stationed in Dinant, Huy, and Limbourg. On July 30, 1675, he was appointed commander of Maastricht, in the absence of Marshal d'Estrades, who was in Nijmegen. François de Calvo had become famous among his contemporaries for his remarkable defense of Maastricht in 1676. From then on, the king placed great trust in his general: "I was without fear when he [Calvo] defended a place", he is reported to have said. Locking himself in the city, the general said: "Gentlemen, I hear nothing of defending a place; all I know is that I don't want to surrender". Indeed, he did not surrender and, for over two months, defended the town with such ardor - the French made a sortie every day, and General de Calvo was at his men's side - against the forces of the Prince of Orange that the latter was forced to lift the siege on August 27, as Marshal de Schomberg's troops approached. Louis XIV, recognizing his merit and deeply satisfied with his general, made him governor of Aire on August 29 and lieutenant-general of his armies on August 30. He was awarded a pension of twenty thousand livres on September 12.

He remained in command of Maastricht until the city was returned to the Dutch and made several forays to keep the enemy at bay, as in May 1678, when he captured the town of Leeuw and took over four hundred prisoners, including thirty-five officers.

On March 25, 1679, when Frederick William I of Brandenburg refused to sign the peace treaty, Calvo was ordered to ravage the duchies of Cleves and Juliers. He captured Cleves and the surrounding country. He was then employed in the Army of the Rhine, under the command of Marshal de Créquy. He again distinguished himself by his courage at the crossing of the Weser near Minden on June 30, 1679.

=== Meeting War ===
In 1684, the King's service led him to return to Catalonia. Having swum across the Ter, he charged the Spanish lines beyond the Pont-Major and almost took their general, the Duc de Bournonville, prisoner; but the night forced him to be cautious and he preferred to withdraw. He took Gerona alongside Marshal de Bellefonds.

=== League of Augsburg War ===
War having resumed in 1688, against the Spanish and their allies, he served in the Flanders army, under Marshal d'Humières. On December 31, 1688, the king made him a knight of his orders and sent him, on May 24, 1689, at the head of a corps of five thousand men, to defend the northern frontier of the kingdom, threatened by twenty thousand Spanish and Dutch soldiers.

== Death and posterity ==
He died of a fluxion of the chest in Deinze on May 29, 1690, aged 64, and is buried in Aire, where he was governor. François de Calvo remains a little-known general under Louis XIV, as journalist Fernand Sendra notes in an article: “François de Calvo, Andorran [sic] and a great servant of the armies of France, ‘le brave Calvo’, does he not deserve to be remembered? ”.

== Genealogy ==
- Josep Calvo (Note: Manrese merchant)⚭ Joana Cellers
  - Pere de Calvo ⚭ Caterina Puigesteve
    - Josep de Calvo (1599-) ⚭ Jerónima de Gualbes
      - Jéromine de Calvo (1624-1650) ⚭ Rafael Antich (1608-1681)
      - François de Calvo (1625-1690) ⚭ Marie de Margarit (1621-1674)
        - François de Calvo (1660-1708) ⚭ Mancia Maduxer
          - Marianne de Calvo (1694-1720) ⚭ Joseph de Tord (1686-1759)
      - Joseph de Calvo (1629-) ⚭ Marie de Bassedes
        - Josèphe de Calvo (1661-1725) ⚭ Jean d'Ardena (1639-1681)
        - Thérèse de Calvo (1666-1733) ⚭ Francois de Tord (1666-1713)
        - Benoît de Calvo (Note: Colonel-lieutenant of the Royal Regiment, killed at the battle of Speyerbach.) (1672-1703)
        - François de Calvo ⚭ Françoise Camus de Beaulieu
      - Pierre de Calvo (1633-1708)
    - Marianna de Calvo (-1624) ⚭ Lluís Rufet
    - Helena de Calvo y (-1646) ⚭ Domenec de Preixana ⚭ Jeroni de Cardona
  - Lucrecia de Calvo ⚭ Josep de Dalmau

== Marriage and descendants ==
On May 7, 1644, he married Marie de Margarit, daughter of Philippe de Margarit and Béatrice de Gallart, his second wife. Marie de Margarit is also the consanguine sister of Joseph de Margarit, Marquis d'Aguilar. They had no children.

However, François de Calvo had a natural son, François de Calvo. The latter held several important positions, including advocate general to the Sovereign Council of Roussillon. On June 26, 1691, he married Mancia Maduxer in the Saint-Jean church in Perpignan, who gave him a daughter named Marie. He obtained letters of legitimation from the king in July 1699.

== Personality ==
A formidable man of war, Calvo had a reputation among his contemporaries for being implacable with his enemies and an excellent administrator. Loyal to the King of France and devoted to Louvois, it was on his orders that he ravaged the country of Liège in 1676, while the French army was besieged in Maastricht. Paillerolles, a diplomat sent by Pomponne to Maastricht, describes General de Calvo as a cold soldier, cruelly lacking in humanity.

One of his biographers describes him as “the finest and bravest man in the army”. François de Calvo was courageous and intrepid; a true commander, he did not hesitate to pay with his person, “he was of the temperament of the Catinats and Turennes, minus the birth ”.

Calvo had a passion for horses, and it was not uncommon to find them in his stable, which was one of the most remarkable of its time, so much so that the greatest draughtsmen took his horses as models. The general called his horse “my heart” and lavished great care on it. There's an anecdote to this effect: when Louis XIV wanted to express his esteem for Calvo and his talents in person, the king remarked on the beauty of his mount and said to the general:

“Calvo, let's change; you won't lose anything at the exchange.

- Sire, resumed the soldier, if Your Majesty asks me for my wife, I'll give her to you, but leave me my heart!

- Stinking belly interrupts the king, your wife has no teeth!

- Sire, replies Calvo, when a horse is given, you don't look at your mouth."

The king bursts out laughing, embraces Calvo and immediately reassures him that his request was only a joke. This remark has since become a saying: “You shouldn't find fault with a present you receive”.

== Service records ==
- January 6, 1647: Captain in the Aguilar cavalry regiment;
- March 13, 1654: mestre de camp in the Calvo cavalry regiment;
- May 12, 1667: brigadier in the king's armies;
- April 2, 1675: Marshal of Camp;
- August 30, 1676: lieutenant-general of the king's armies.

== Titles ==
- Comte de Calvo; (Note: His nephew, Benoît de Calvo Bassedes, took the title of Marquis de Calvo, before buying the county of Formiguères from the Descallar family on June 2, 1699, with his brother François.)
- Baron de Calonge (1648).

== Ornaments ==

- Chevalier des ordres du roi (11th promotion, Versailles, December 31, 1688);
- Chevalier du Saint-Esprit;
- Chevalier de Saint-Michel.

== Coat of arms ==
| Figure | Informations | |
|---|---|---|
| | Crown | Count |
| | Coat of arms | Quarterly: on 1 Or, a bend Gules (de Calvo); on 2 Argent, three fesses wavy Azure (de Gualbes); on 3 Argent, a mount Azure surmounted by a comet of six stripes Gules (de Puigesteve); on 4 Or, a bend Sable edged with coins Or (de Bret). |
| | Supports | Lions |
| | Decorations | Order of the Holy Spirit Order of Saint Michael |

== See also ==
- Reapers' War
- Siege of Maastricht (1676)
- 54th Infantry Regiment (France)

== Bibliography ==
- Moréri, Louis (1718). Le grand dictionnaire historique ou le mélange curieux de l'histoire sacrée et profane: l'histoire fabuleuse des vies et des actions remarquables. Étienne Ledoux.
- Pinard, Jean-Baptiste (1761). Chronologie historique et militaire. Paris: Claude Hérissant.
