= Antoine Béthouart =

French general (1889–1982)

Marie Émile Antoine Béthouart
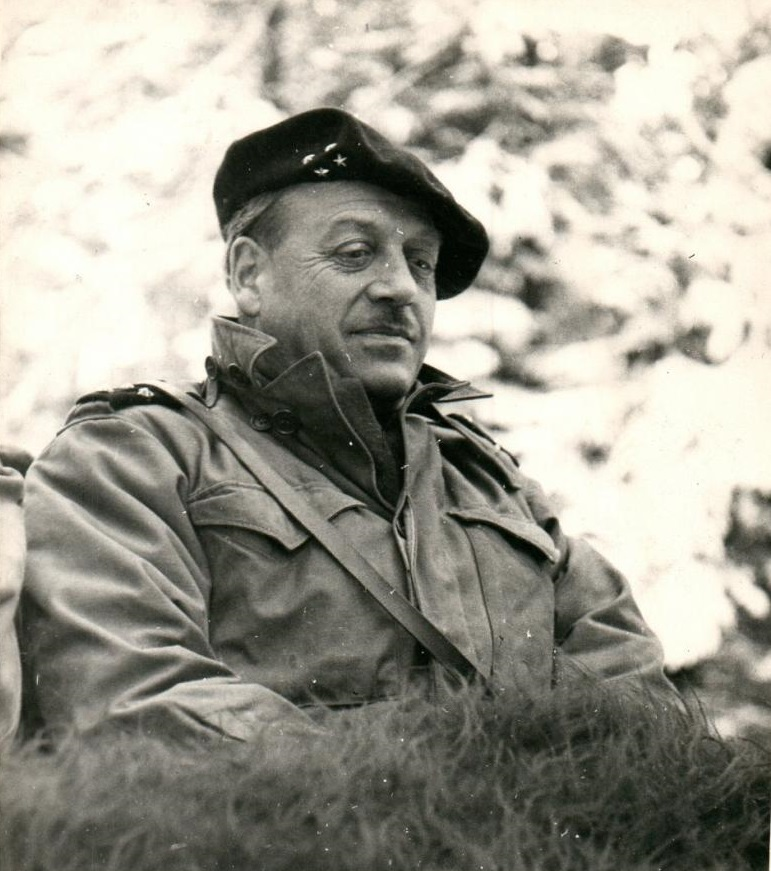
- Born: 17 December 1889; Dole, Jura, France
- Died: 17 October 1982 (aged 92); Fréjus, France
- Military career
- Allegiance: (France) French Army
- Rank: Général d'Armée
- Commands: I Corps
- Conflicts: World War I World War II
- Other work: Sénateur

Marie Émile Antoine Béthouart (French pronunciation: [maʁi emil ɑ̃twan betwaʁ]; 17 December 1889 – 17 October 1982) was a French Army general who served during World War I and World War II.

Born in Dole, Jura, in the Jura Mountains, Béthouart graduated from Saint-Cyr military academy and served as a platoon leader in the 159th Alpine Infantry Regiment during World War I. After the First World War, he served as an advisor to the Royal Yugoslav Army and was named an instructor at the French High Mountain Military School.

Promoted to colonel in 1937, Béthouart was made a brevet brigadier in January 1940. This promotion was made permanent in April 1941 and was followed by promotion to major general in December 1942. Béthouart was promoted again to lieutenant general in November 1943, and then to general in 1948.

Béthouart commanded the French 1st Division of Chasseurs (elite light infantry) in the Norwegian campaign in 1940, serving in the area of Narvik.

Subsequently, Béthouart commanded the Casablanca Division of French forces in Morocco and assisted the Allies in rallying the French troops in Morocco to the Allied cause in November 1942. Arrested by Vichy French officials on 10 November 1942, Béthouart was liberated by the Allies on 14 November. Later, Béthouart served as the chief of the French military mission in Washington, D.C. from December 1942 until November 1943 and as the Chief of Staff of the (French) Committee for National Defense from April 1944 until August 1944. In August 1944, Béthouart briefly served as the Chief of Staff of Armée B, later known as the French First Army.

On 1 September 1944, Béthouart took command of the French I Corps in General de Lattre's Armée B. Béthouart commanded the corps with distinction for the remainder of the war in Europe. He fought with 140,000 men in Alsace but became famous for his part in the offensive in Germany with his corps becoming the first Allied troops to reach the Danube and enter Austria. His corps is credited with taking 101,556 Germans prisoner during the campaigns to liberate France and invade Germany.

During the postwar period, Béthouart served first as the chief of French occupation forces in Austria, and then as the High Commissioner for France in Austria between 1946 and 1950.

Béthouart subsequently served as a senateur for overseas French citizens from 1955 until 1971. He died in Fréjus on 17 October 1982, and was buried in Rue.

In June 2003 a bridge was named for him in Innsbruck.
