= Édouard-Jean-Étienne Deligny =

French general

Édouard-Jean-Étienne Deligny (12 December 1815 – February 1902) was a French general. He commanded the 4th Army Corps.
