= 150th Infantry Regiment (France) =

Infantry regiment of the French Army (1794–1996)

- 150e régiment d'infanterie
- Unit insignia
- Active: 1794–1996
- Country: France
- Branch: French Army
- Type: Infantry
- Engagements: Napoleonic Wars; World War I; World War II; Cold War

Insignia
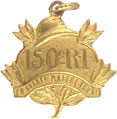
- Regimental badge

The 150th Infantry Regiment (150e régiment d'infanterie or 150e RI) was an infantry regiment of the French Army. Also known as the Régiment de Bagatelle, it inherited the traditions of several earlier formations bearing the number 150, serving from the French Revolutionary Wars until its final disbandment in 1996.

== History ==
The regiment’s origins trace back to the 150th Demi-Brigade (1794–1796) and the 150th Line Infantry Regiment (1813–1814), formed by Napoleon I for the German campaign and disbanded after heavy losses at Arras in July 1814. A new 150th Infantry Regiment was created on 25 July 1887, continuing the earlier traditions.

During the First World War, the regiment was based in Verdun in 1914. It saw extensive service on the Western Front, fighting at Alsace, the Marne, Champagne, Verdun, and the Somme. The names of soldiers from the regiment who died during the War are recorded in the publication Liste des morts du 150e R.I., preserved by the Bibliothèque nationale de France.

In World War II, it formed part of the 12th Infantry Division and held the French sector of the Dunkirk perimeter in May–June 1940, fighting until its surrender at Malo-les-Bains on 4 June after covering the evacuation of Operation Dynamo. The regiment was briefly re-formed within the Armistice Army at Agen in 1940, disbanded in 1942, and later revived within the Free French Forces at Verdun in 1944. Reorganised in early 1945, it took part in the liberation of Royan before again being dissolved the following year.

A new 150th Infantry Battalion was created in 1946 and deployed to Morocco in 1947 before disbanding in 1949. The designation returned in 1963 for a motorised infantry regiment, later converted to mechanised status in 1975. It was disbanded in 1990, briefly revived as a reserve regiment, and permanently dissolved in 1996, ending more than two centuries of intermittent service.

== Traditions ==
- **Nickname:** Régiment de Bagatelle
- **Motto:** En avant malgré tout (“Forward despite everything”)
- **Insignia:** Badge depicting the unit motto and regimental symbols

== Battle honours ==
- Napoleonic Wars
- World War I
- World War II
- Cold War

== See also ==
- List of French infantry regiments

== Sources ==
- Buat, Edmond; Guelton, Frédéric (2015-11-03). Journal du Général Edmond Buat 1914-1923 (in French). Place des éditeurs. ISBN 978-2-262-06503-4.
- Service historique de la Défense. "Liste des morts du 150ème R. I." Gallica.
