= Ciply =

Sub-municipality of the city of Mons, Belgium

Ciply Cipli (Walloon)
- Sub-municipality of Mons
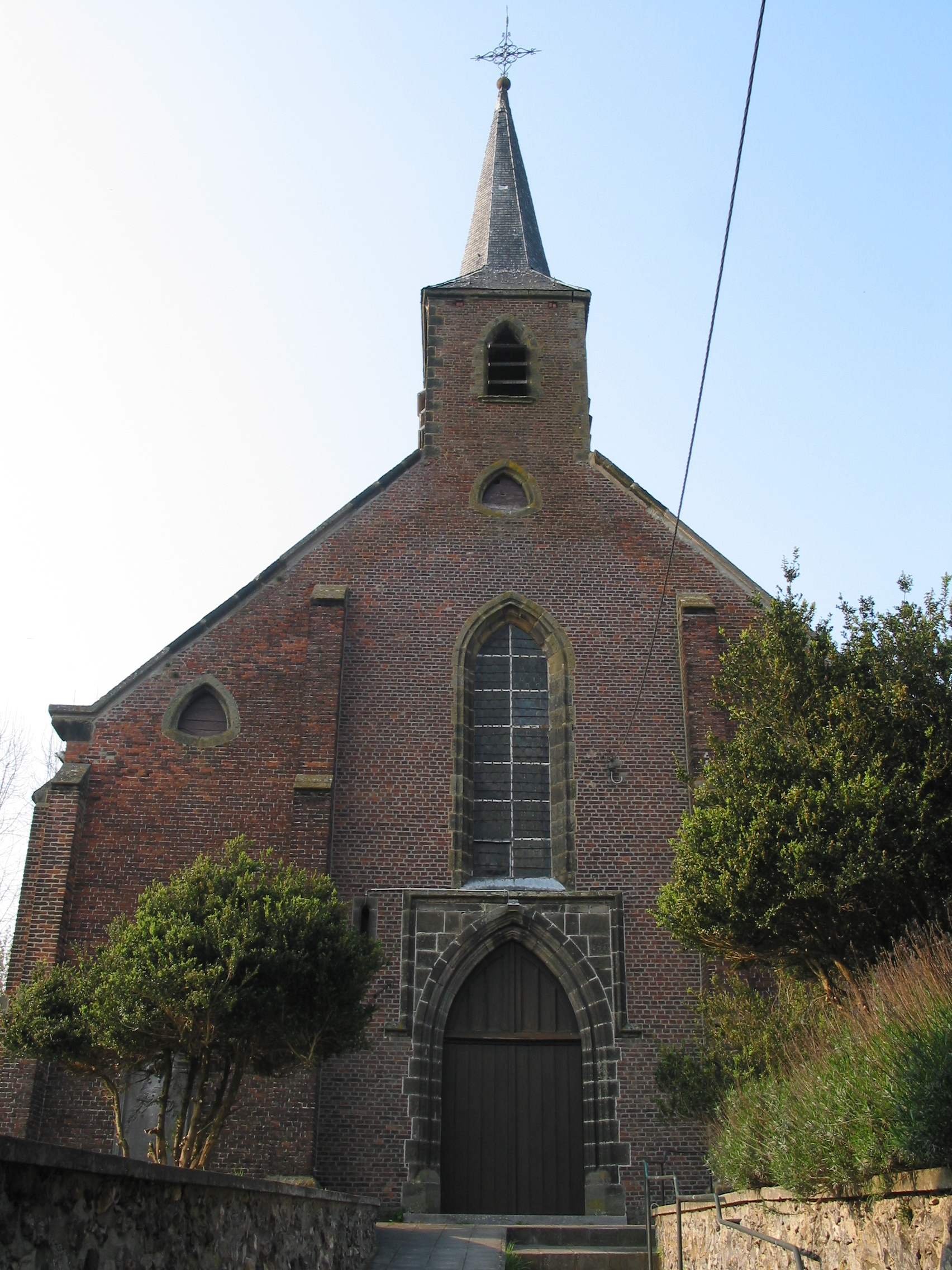
- Saint-Waudru Church

- Location of Ciply in Mons
- Interactive map of Ciply
- Location within Belgium Location within Hainaut (Belgium)
- Coordinates: 50°25′09″N 3°56′38″E
- Country: Belgium
- Community: French Community
- Region: Wallonia
- Province: Hainaut
- Arrondissement: Mons
- Municipality: Mons

Area
  - Total: 2.38 km^{2} (0.92 sq mi)

Population (2020-01-01)
  - Total: 740
  - Density: 310/km^{2} (810/sq mi)
- Postal codes: 7024
- Area codes: 065

Ciply (French pronunciation: [sipli]; Walloon: Cipli) is a sub-municipality of the city of Mons located in the province of Hainaut, Wallonia, Belgium. It was a separate municipality until 1977. On 1 January 1977, it was merged into Mons.
