= Rhisnes =

Coordinates: 50.506958°N 4.805911°E

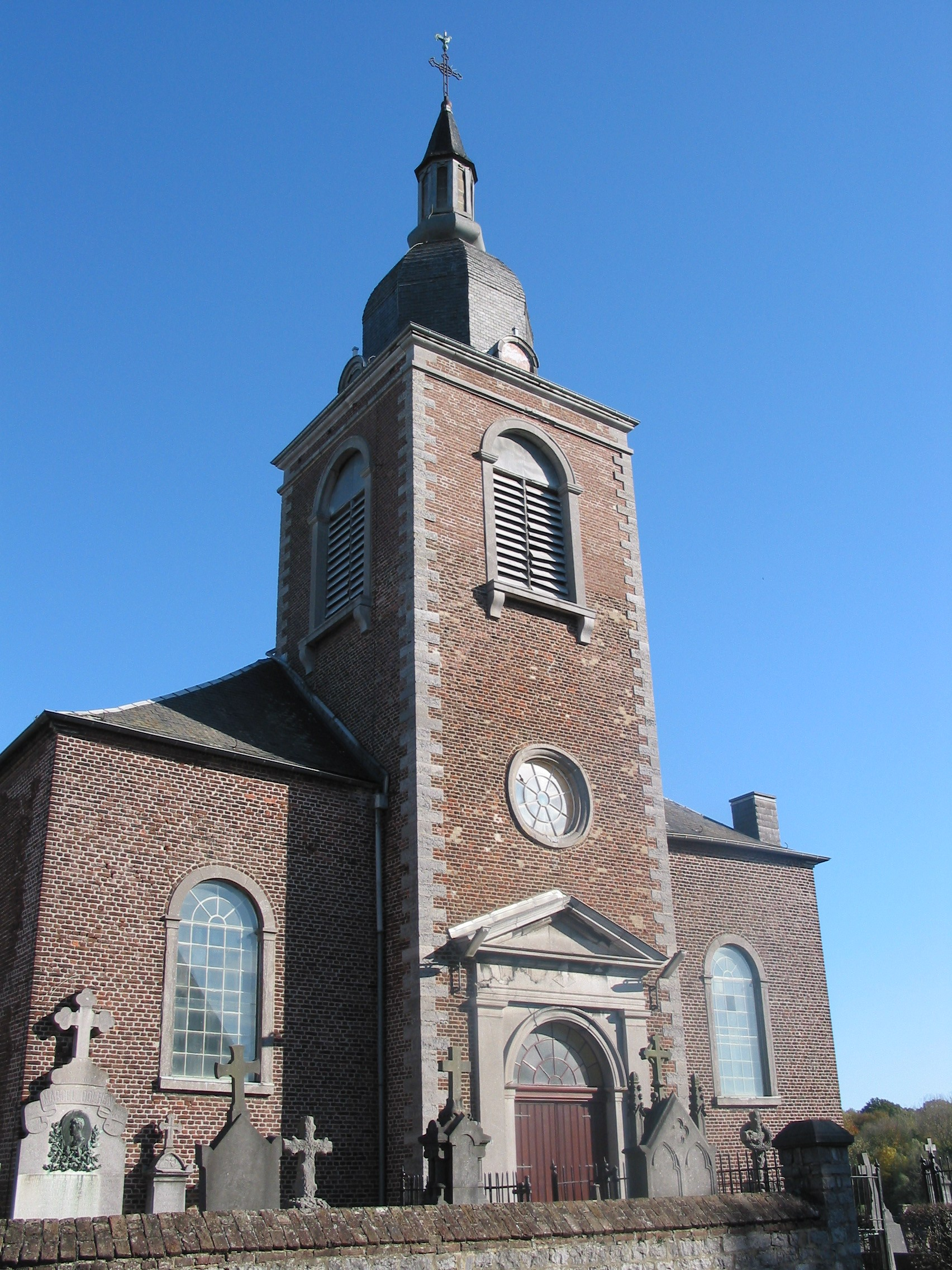
The Church of Saint-Didier (1841-1845)

Rhisnes (French pronunciation: [ʁin]; Walloon: Rénne) is a town of Wallonia and a district of the municipality of La Bruyère, located in the province of Namur, Belgium.

Formerly the center of its own municipality, the post-1974 fusion of the Belgian municipalities brought together seven of these ancienne communes to create the La Bruyère municipality. Rhisnes is the largest population center in La Bruyère, and serves as the administrative seat.
