= François Marie Casimir de Négrier =

French general

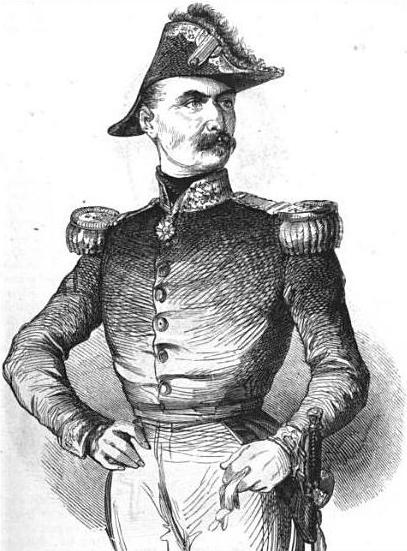
François de Négrier

François Marie Casimir de Négrier (27 April 1788 in Le Mans – 25 June 1848 in Lille) was a French general who fought in the Napoleonic Wars and the 1848 Revolution. Aged 12 he accompanied Jean Lannes on his embassy to Portugal. From 1830 he was colonel of the 54th Infantry Regiment.

== Sources ==
- Mullié, Charles (1852). "Négrier (François-Marie-Casimir)" . Biographie des célébrités militaires des armées de terre et de mer de 1789 à 1850 (in French). Paris: Poignavant et Compagnie.
