= Lucien Loizeau =

French general

Lucien Loizeau (9 April 1879 – 6 June 1978) was a French general who was known for his writings on military topics. Commander of the French 6th Army Corps at the beginning of World War II, he was taken prisoner by the Germans in 1940 and was held for the remainder of the war at the German POW camp at Königstein Fortress. He was awarded the Grand Cross of the Legion of Honour in 1950.
