= 7th Armoured Division (France) =

7^{e} Division Blindée
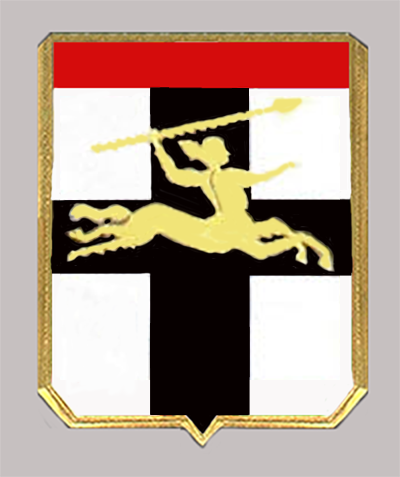
- Active: 1955 – 1 July 1999
- Country: France
- Branch: French Army
- Type: Armoured

The 7th Armoured Division (French: 7^{e} Division Blindée, 7e DB) was an armoured division of the French Army. The division was active during the Cold War and some time after the fall of the Berlin Wall, before being disbanded. Its traditions were carried on by the 7th Armoured Brigade.

== History ==
The division was created in 1955 as the 7^{e} Division Mecanique Rapide (7th Fast Mechanised Division), commanded by General François Huet and based in Constance (Germany). It was an experimental formation of the French Army and served to test of new structures and tactics for the expected nuclear battlefield and also new weapons, being the first large unit equipped with the new, light-weight Panhard EBR armoured cars and AMX-13 tanks.

In early 1956 the division was transferred to French North Africa, where its soldiers served as infantry supporting French operations in the Algerian War. In late 1956 the division was hurriedly reunited with its tanks and armoured cars to take part in Operation Musketeer, the invasion of Egypt by Franco-British forces. It then returned to Algeria where it remained until 1961.

The division was transferred to Metropolitan France, with its headquarters at Besançon, forming part of I Corps. The division was renamed, becoming the 7^{e} Division Légère Blindée (7th Light Armoured Division). It became simply the 7^{e} Division Blindée (7th Armoured Division) in 1963 when the 8th Motorised Infantry Brigade joined the division. In the 1970s the French Army returned to the idea of smaller, more flexible divisions, the idea which had originally led to the creation of the division. It was selected to test the new ideas, and its 7th Mechanised Brigade did much of the experimental work.

With the adoption of the new divisional structure in 1977, the 7th Armoured Division was dissolved and the new 7th Armoured, as well as the 4th Armoured and 8th Infantry Divisions, was created from the remains. The new division continued to be based at Besançon. It was later reassigned from I Corps, at Metz to III Corps at Lille. It too was reorganised on 1 July 1999, as part of the changes which followed the end of the Cold War and the professionalisation of the French Army, to create the new 7th Armoured Brigade which carries on the traditions of the 7th Armoured.

== Composition ==
=== 1955 to 1963 ===
- 2^{e} Régiment de Dragons (2e RD)
- Régiment Colonial de Chasseurs de Chars (RCCC)
- 3^{e} Régiment de Chasseurs d'Afrique (3e RCA)
- 21^{e} Régiment d'Infanterie Coloniale (21e RIC)
- 72^{e} Groupe d'Artillerie
- 457^{e} Groupe d'Artillerie
- 57^{e} Bataillon du Génie
- 57^{e} Bataillon des services
- 57^{e} Compagnie de quartier général
- 57^{e} Compagnie de réparation divisionnaire
- 2^{e} Groupe aéromobile

=== 1963 to 1977 ===
As 7^{e} Brigade Mécanisé of 7^{e} Division Blindée

- 1^{er} Régiment de Dragons (1er RD) Armoured Regiment
- 30^{e} Régiment de Dragons (30e RD) Armoured Regiment
- 35^{e} Régiment d'Infanterie (35e RI) Infantry Regiment
- 1^{er} Régiment d'Artillerie (1er RA) Artillery Regiment

=== 1977 to 1999 ===
As 7^{e} Division Blindée

- 3^{e} Régiment de Cuiriassiers (3e RC) Armoured Regiment
- 1^{er} Régiment de Dragons (1er RD) Armoured Regiment
- 5^{e} Régiment de Dragons (5e RD) Armoured Regiment
- 35^{e} Régiment d'Infanterie (35e RI) Infantry Regiment
- 170^{e} Régiment d'Infanterie (170e RI) Infantry Regiment
- (to 1990) 30^{e} Groupe de Chasseurs (30e GC) Infantry Regiment
- 1st Artillery Regiment (1^{er} Régiment d'Artillerie) (1er RA)
- (to 1993) 60^{e} Régiment d'Artillerie (40e RA) Artillery Regiment
- (from 1993) 32^{e} Régiment d'Artillerie (32e RA) Artillery Regiment
- 19^{e} Régiment du Génie (19e RG) Engineer Regiment
- 7^{e} Régiment de commandement et de Soutien (7e RCS) Command and Signals Regiment
