= Temploux =

Sub-municipality of the city of Namur, Belgium

Temploux Timplou (Walloon)
- Sub-municipality of Namur
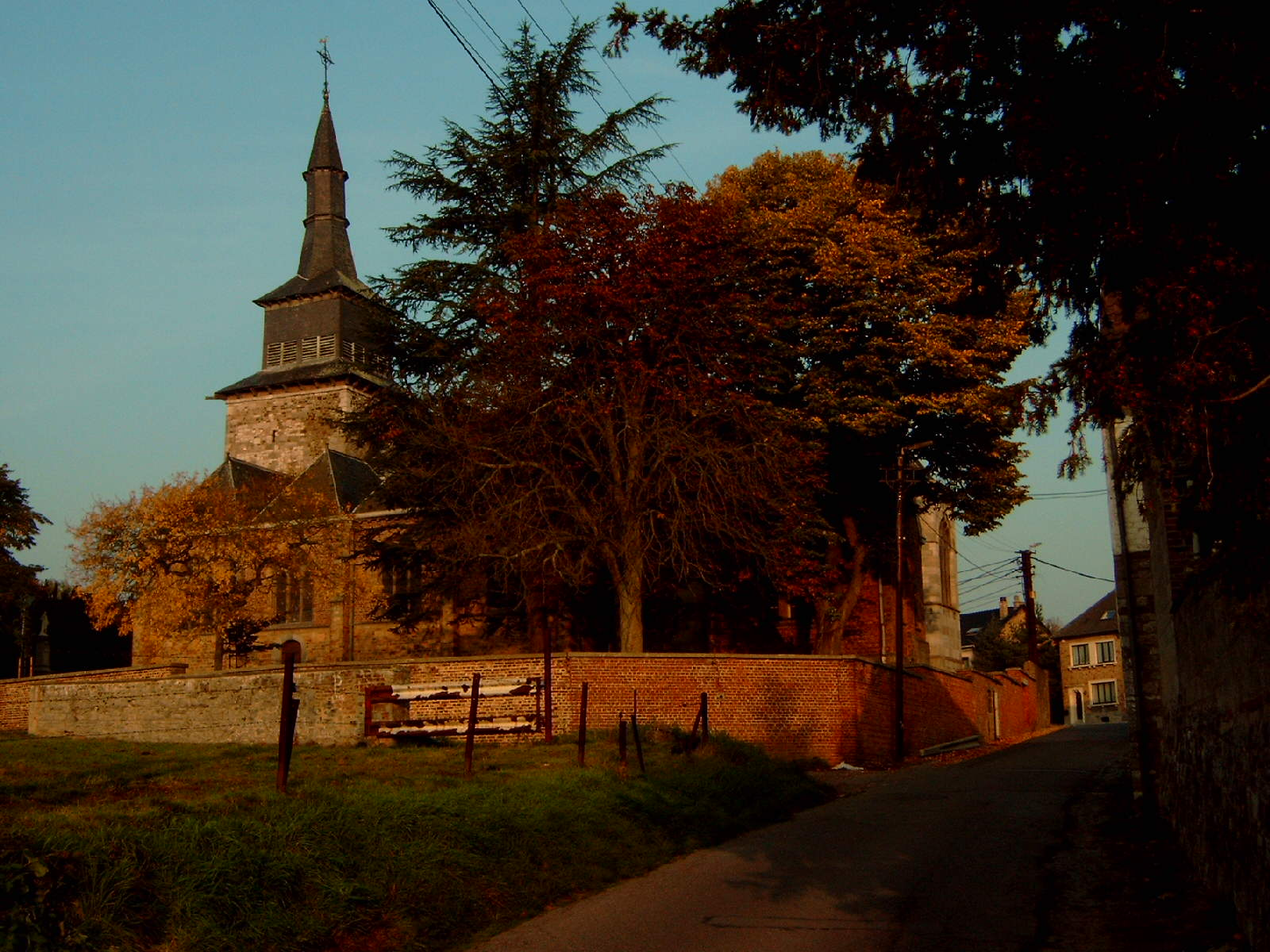
- Saint-Hilaire Church in the centre of Temploux

- Location of Temploux in Namur
- Interactive map of Temploux
- Location within Belgium Location within Namur Province
- Coordinates: 50°29′00″N 4°45′00″E
- Country: Belgium
- Community: French Community
- Region: Wallonia
- Province: Namur
- Arrondissement: Namur
- Municipality: Namur

Area
  - Total: 11.53 km^{2} (4.45 sq mi)

Population (2020-01-01)
  - Total: 2,136
  - Density: 185.3/km^{2} (479.8/sq mi)
- Postal codes: 5020
- Area codes: 081
- Website: temploux.be

Temploux (French pronunciation: [tɑ̃plu]; Walloon: Timplou) is a sub-municipality of the city of Namur located in the province of Namur, Wallonia, Belgium. It was a separate municipality until 1977. On 1 January 1977, it was merged into Namur.

It lies in the Condroz 7 kilometres (4.3 mi) west of the city centre.
