= 1st Army Corps (France) =

Inactive French Army formation

1^{er} Corps d'Armée
- Active: 1913 - 1919; 27 August 1939 − 10 July 1940; 16 August 1943 – 30 April 1946 c.1960s – 1990; 1st January 2026 – present
- Country: France
- Branch: French Army
- Type: Corps
- Part of: First Army (France), Seventh Army (France)
- Engagements: World War I, World War II

Commanders
- Notable commanders: Adolphe Guillaumat; Henri Martin; Émile Béthouart

The 1st Army Corps (French: 1^{er} Corps d'Armée) is a French army corps. It was first formed before World War I. During World War II it fought in the Battle for France in 1940, on the Mediterranean islands of Corsica and Elba in 1943–1944 and in the campaigns to liberate France in 1944 and invade Germany in 1945. The 1st Army Corps (1^{er} Corps d'Armée) was recreated in 2026.

== World War I ==
The Corps saw service throughout the entirety of World War I. During the Battles of St. Quentin and Guise, the 1st Corps forced Karl von Bülow's 2nd Army into retreat in what historian Stuart Robson called "the last old-style Napoleonic infantry charge in history." This forced Alexander von Kluck to divert the 1st Army as a reinforcement, preventing the Imperial German Army from encircling Paris and overrunning France under the Schlieffen Plan.

The Corps participated in the Battle of Passchendaele as part of the First Army. At the time, the Corps comprised the 1st Division, 2nd Division, 51st Division and 162nd Division. Its troops came from the 1st military region of the Metropolitan Army, which covered the départements of Nord and Pas-de-Calais.

=== Commanders in WW I ===
- 20 November 1913 : général Franchet d'Espérey
- 3 September 1914 : Général Deligny
- 25 February 1915 : général Guillaumat
- 17 December 1916 : Général de Riols de Fonclare
- 25 January 1917 : Général Muteau
- 19 April 1917 : Général Lacapelle
- 11 February 1919 : Général Nollet

== World War II ==
=== 1940 Campaign ===
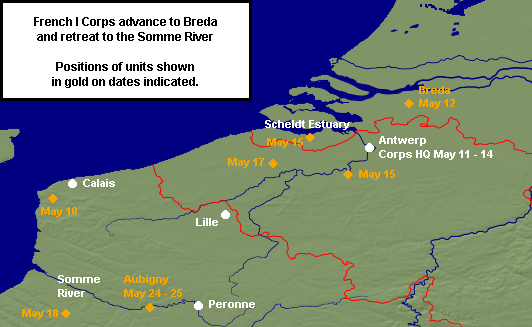
Advance to Breda and retreat to the Somme.

1st Army Corps (part of Seventh Army) retreated to the Somme to avoid being cut off by the German advance.

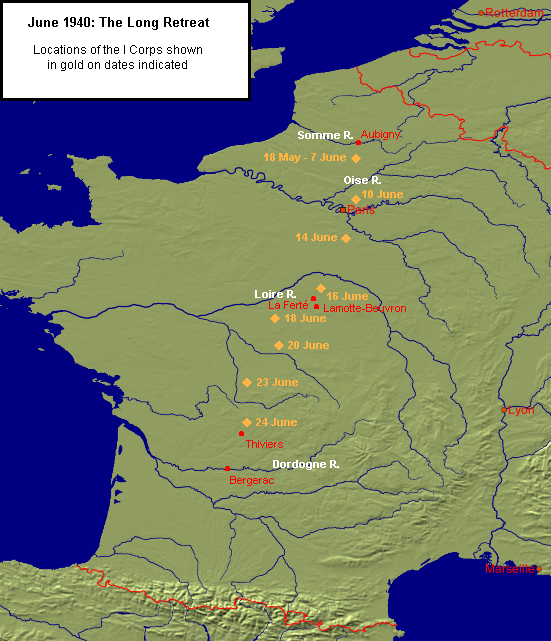
June 1940: the I Corps' long retreat.

1st Army Corps was constituted on August 27, 1939, in Lille under the command of Major General Sciard as part of the French mobilization for war. Initially assigned as part of the First Army, the corps was transferred to the Seventh Army and moved to coastal regions near Calais and Dunkerque by mid-November 1939. On May 10, 1940, the Corps commanded the 25th Motorised Infantry Division (25^{e} DIM) in addition to its organic units.

With the German invasion violating the neutrality of Belgium and the Netherlands on May 10, 1940, the 1st Army Corps moved into Belgium with the goal of gaining contact with the Dutch Army. This was achieved on May 12 near Breda, but the general failure of the Allies to hold the German advance mandated early retreats so that the 1st Army Corps would not be cut off. Breda fell to the Germans on May 13 and the corps conducted a fighting withdrawal through Dorp and Wuustwezel to the fortified zone of Antwerp, Belgium. From May 15 to 17, the corps defended the Scheldt Estuary with the 60th Infantry division and 21st Infantry Division (60^{e} DI and 21^{e} DI), but was ordered to retreat into France on May 18.

The period from May 19 to 26 saw the corps falling back to the line of the river Somme, where the French Army intended to make a stand. Because of German advances, the 1st Army Corps had to deploy its divisional reconnaissance units to cover positions on the river that the slower-moving infantry divisions (4th Colonial Infantry Division - 4^{e} DIC, 7th North African Infantry Division - 7^{e} DINA, and the 19^{e} DI) could occupy. The corps reached positions near Le Hamel, Aubigny and along the road between Amiens and Saint-Quentin. During May 24 to 25, troops of the corps seized and lost Aubigny twice. The Germans had held onto a large bridgehead at Peronne. The Germans broke out of this bridgehead on June 5, 1940, and continued their advance into the heart of France. A counter-attack by armored elements of the corps on June 6 was halted by the Germans.

From June 9, the corps was involved in withdrawals that were meant to form lines of defense along the rivers Avre, Oise, Nonette, Seine, and Loire. The crossing of the Oise River was made under German air attack, some bridges were destroyed by the Luftwaffe, and portions of the corps' infantry had to surrender north of the Oise.

After the Germans crossed the Loire on June 18, the 19^{e} DI of the corps was largely destroyed near La Ferté. This was followed by capture of the bulk of the infantry of the 29th (29^{e} DI) and 47th Infantry Divisions (47^{e} DI) on June 19 near Lamotte-Beuvron. The final week of the campaign was a constant retreat for the remnants of the corps, with elements crossing the river Dordogne near Bergerac on June 24, 1940. The following day, an armistice was declared and the corps assembled in the region of Miallet and Thiviers.

On July 1, Brigadier General Trancart assumed command of the corps. The 1st Army Corps was demobilized on July 10, 1940.

=== Corsica 1943 ===
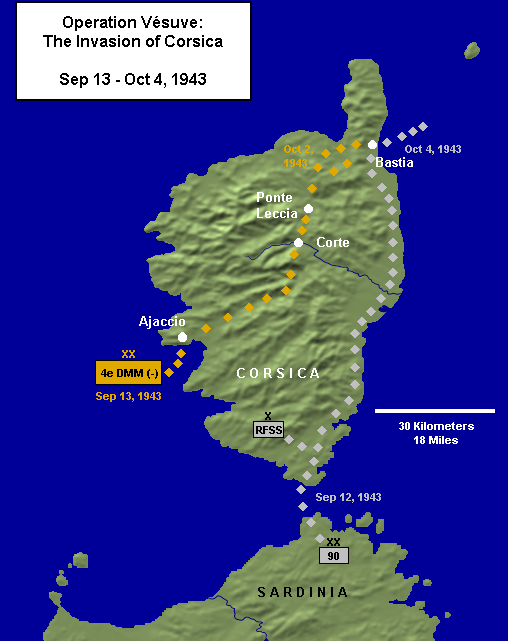
Operation Vésuve: The Invasion of Corsica.

The 1st Army Corps was reconstituted on August 16, 1943, in Ain-Taya, French Algeria. Now commanded by Lieutenant General Martin the primary combat units of the corps were provided American equipment and weapons as part of the rearmament of the French Army of Africa.

During the Allied invasion of Italy the 1st Army Corps, comprising Headquarters, 4th Moroccan Mountain Division (4^{e} DMM), the 1st Regiment of Moroccan Tirailleurs (1^{er} RTM), the 4th Regiment of Moroccan Spahis (4^{e} RSM) (light tank), the 2nd Group of Moroccan Tabors (2^{e} GTM), the Commandos de Choc battalion and the 3rd Battalion, 69th Mountain Artillery Regiment (69^{e} RAM), landed on Fascist-occupied Corsica in the same month. To the south, the German 90. Panzergrenadier-Division and the Reichsführer-SS assault infantry brigade were evacuating Sardinia and landing on the southern coast of Corsica. Wishing to cut off the German troops, and informed on September 10, 1943, that the Royal Italian Army troops on Corsica were willing to fight on the side of the Allies, the French launched Operation Vésuve and landed elements of the 1st Army Corps at Ajaccio on September 13, meeting Corsican partisans who also wanted enemy troops off the island.

German General Fridolin von Senger und Etterlin hoped to obtain reinforcements with which to hold the island. After the Germans began disarming Italian soldiers, General Magli of the Italian Army ordered Italian forces to consider the Germans as an enemy rather than as allies. Thereafter, Italian units on the island cooperated with the French forces. Surprising the Italian Friuli Division in the northern port of Bastia on the night of September 13, 1943, the SS troops took 2,000 Italian prisoners and secured the port from which the Germans could evacuate their forces. Although supported by the Royal Navy, the French were unable to land forces quickly enough on Corsica to prevent the bulk of the German troops from reaching their exit ports on the east coast of the island. The final combat took place around Bastia, with the island secured by French forces on October 4, 1943. The bulk of the German forces had made good their escape. The Germans took 700 casualties and lost 350 men to POW camps. The Italians lost 800 men in the fighting (mostly Friuli Division troops), and the French had 75 killed, 12 missing, and 239 wounded. From October 1943 until May 1944, the 1st Army Corps defended Corsica, conducted training, and moved units between Corsica and North Africa. On April 18, 1944, the 1st Army Corps was subordinated to General de Lattre's Armée B.

=== Elba 1944 ===
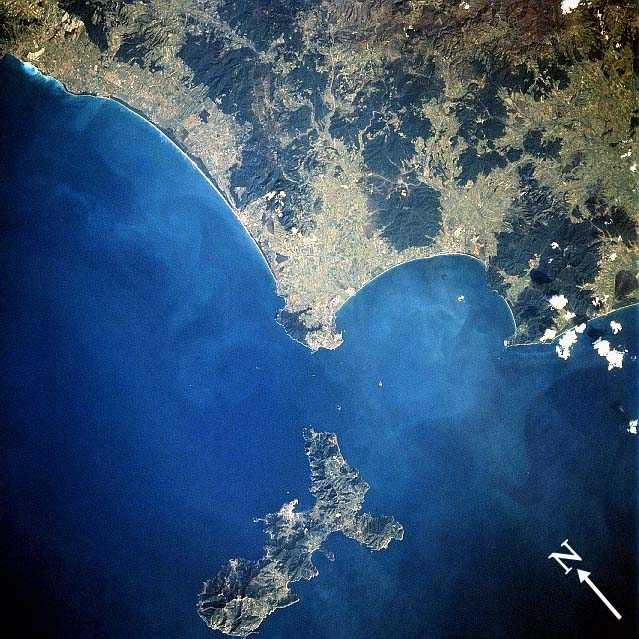
Satellite view of Elba (bottom) showing rugged terrain.

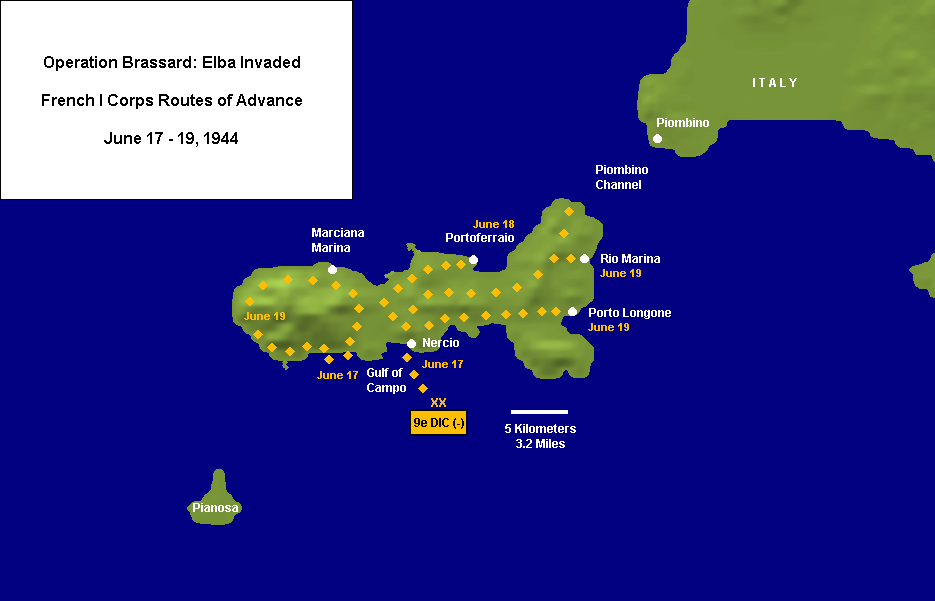
Operation Brassard: The invasion of Elba, 1944.

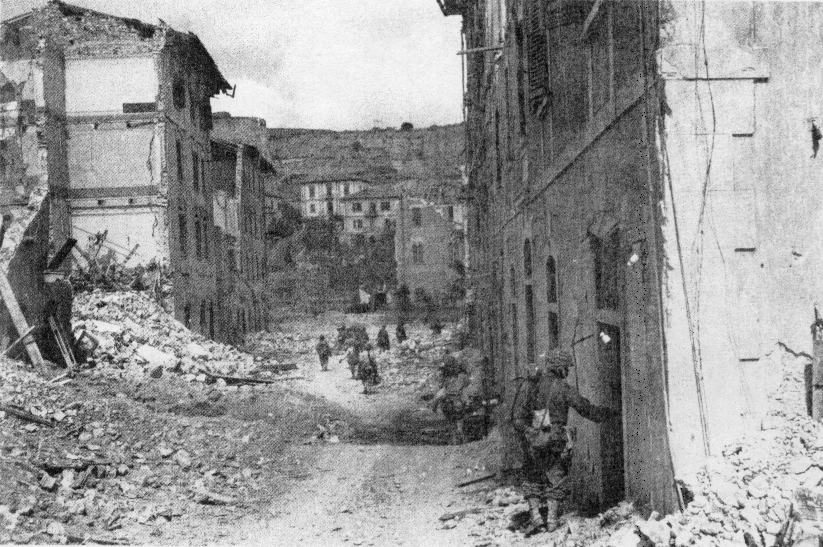
French troops enter Portoferraio on June 18, 1944.

Following the liberation of Corsica, the French proposed to invade the island of Elba, possession of which would allow the Allies to dominate by gunfire ships in the Piombino Channel and vehicles on the coastal road of the Italian Peninsula, both transportation arteries essential to the supply of German Wehrmacht forces in western Italy. Initially, the proposal was denied by General Eisenhower, who considered it a dispersal of resources while the planning for the Anzio landings was underway. After British General Sir Henry Maitland Wilson took over the Mediterranean Theater, however, attitudes at Allied headquarters changed and the operation was approved. By this time, though, the Germans had strongly fortified Elba, an island dominated by rugged terrain in any case, making the assault considerably more difficult.

At 0400 hours on June 17, 1944, the 1st Army Corps assaulted Elba in Operation Brassard. French forces comprised the 9th Colonial Infantry Division (9^{e} DIC), two battalions of French commandos (Commandos d'Afrique and Commandos de Choc), a battalion and supplementary battery of the Colonial Artillery Regiment of Morocco (R.A.C.M.) and the 2nd Group of Moroccan Tabors (2^{e} GTM), in addition to 48 men from "A" and "O" commandos of the Royal Navy. French Choc (lightly armed fighters who had the mission of operating behind enemy lines) units landed at multiple points before the main landing force and neutralized coastal artillery batteries. Landing in the Gulf of Campo on the south coast, the French initially ran into difficulties because of the German fortifications and extremely rugged terrain that ringed the landing area. Falling back on an alternate plan, the landing beach was shifted to the east, near Nercio, and here the troops of the 9th Colonial Infantry Division seized a viable beachhead. Within two hours, French commandos reached the crest of the 400-meter Monte Tambone Ridge overlooking the landing areas. The RN commandos boarded and seized the German Flak ship Köln and also landed to guide in other troops headed for the beaches, but a massive blast from a German demolition charge killed 38 of their men. Portoferraio was taken by the 9th Division on June 18 and the island was largely secured by the following day. Fighting in the hills between the Germans and the Senegalese colonial infantry was vicious, with the Senegalese employing flamethrowers to clear entrenched German troops.

The Germans defended Elba with two infantry battalions, fortified coastal areas, and several coastal artillery batteries totaling some 60 guns of medium and heavy caliber. In the fighting, the French seized the island, killing 500 German and Italian defenders, and taking 1,995 of them prisoner. French losses were 252 killed and missing, and 635 men wounded in action, while the British lost 38 of their 48 commandos, with nine others wounded by the blast of the demolition charge.

=== France 1944 ===
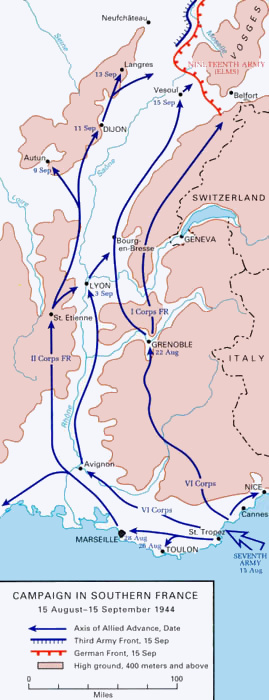
Advance of U.S. and French forces after landing in southern France, August - September, 1944.

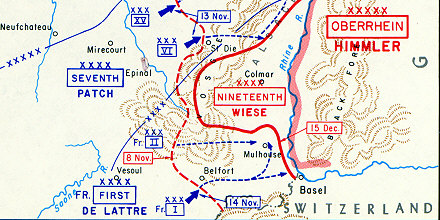
The Belfort Gap forced and the formation of the Colmar Pocket, November - December, 1944.

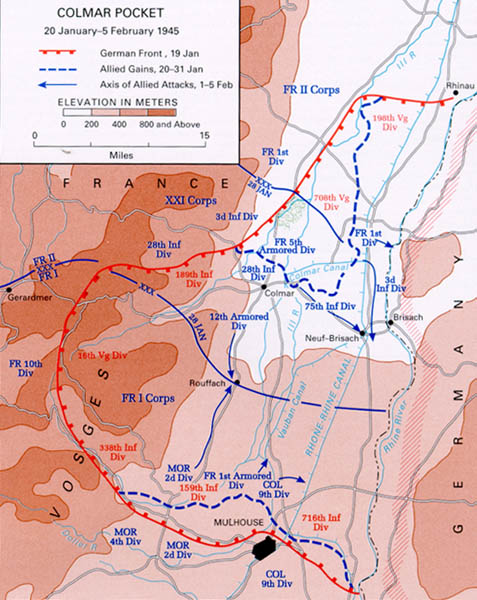
The Battle of the Colmar Pocket, January 20 - February 9, 1945.

Following the successful Operation Dragoon landings in southern France, the headquarters of the 1st Army Corps was assembled at Aix, France on September 1, 1944, to command troops as a subordinate corps of the First Army. 1st Army Corps was now under the command of Lieutenant General Émile Béthouart, a veteran of the 1940 campaign in Norway and an officer who had actively assisted the Allied landings in French North Africa in November 1942. For the remainder of the war in Europe, many French divisions would be subordinated to 1st Army Corps, but the divisions that spent the most time with the corps were the 2nd Moroccan Infantry Division (2^{e} DIM), the 9th Colonial Infantry Division (9^{e} DIC), the 4th Moroccan Mountain Division (4^{e} DMM), and the 1st Armoured Division (1^{re} DB).

The 1st Army Corps drove north along the east bank of the river Rhône, but the push lacked strength as the 4^{e} DMM was still deploying to France (and would be further engaged securing the alpine frontier with Italy for several months) and the 1^{re} DB was still assembling in southern France. In mid-September, the corps secured the Lomont Mountains, a range about 130 kilometers (81 mi) long running from the river Doubs to the Swiss border. German resistance was spotty in September, but rapidly coalesced in front of the Belfort Gap, a corridor of relatively flat terrain that lies between the Vosges and the Jura Mountains on the Swiss frontier, and a gateway to the river Rhine. Operating with one division and experiencing the same logistics problems as other Allied units in Europe, the advance of the 1st Army Corps was slowed in front of the Belfort Gap by the German 11. Panzer-Division.

Compounding the distance that supplies had to travel from the ports in southern France were the north–south railway lines with destroyed bridges and sections of track. Early October 1944 also saw the unseasonably early arrival of cold and wet weather more characteristic of November. All of these factors served to force a halt to the 1st Army Corps' advance in October while the corps improved its supply situations and resolved manpower issues caused by the French high command's decision to rotate the Senegalese troops to the south and replace them with French Forces of the Interior manpower, known as the blanchiment. The supply situation had improved by early November, coinciding with orders from General Eisenhower, now in charge of all Allied forces in northwestern Europe, directing a general offensive all along the Western Front.

Believing that the relative inactivity of 1st Army Corps meant the corps was digging in for the winter, the Germans reduced their forces in the Belfort Gap to a single, not-at-full strength infantry division. The 1st Army Corps launched their attack to force the Belfort Gap on November 13, 1944. By a stroke of fate, the French attack caught the German division commander near the front lines, who perished under a hail of Moroccan gunfire. The same attack narrowly missed capturing the commander of the German IV. Luftwaffen-Feldkorps. Although desperate German troops formed islands of resistance, most notably at the fortified city of Belfort, troops of the 2^{e} DIM, 9^{e} DIC, and the 1^{re} DB pushed through gaps in the German lines, disrupting their defense and keeping the battle mobile. French tanks moved through the Belfort Gap and reached the Rhine at Huningue on November 19.

The battle cut off the German 308. Grenadier-Regiment on November 24, forcing the German troops to either surrender or intern themselves in Switzerland. On November 25, 1st Army Corps units liberated both Mulhouse (taken by a surprise armored drive) and Belfort (taken by assault of the 2^{e} DIM). Realizing the German defense had been too static for their own good, General De Lattre (commander of the First Army) directed both corps of his army to close on Burnhaupt in order to encircle the German LXIII. Armeekorps (the former IV. Luftwaffe Korps). This maneuver succeeded on November 28, 1944, and resulted in the capture of over 10,000 German troops, crippling the LXIII. Armeekorps. French losses had also been significant, and plans to immediately clear the Alsatian Plain of German forces had to be shelved while both sides gathered strength for the next battles.

The November offensives of the French First Army and the U.S. Seventh Army had collapsed the German presence in Alsace to a roughly circular pocket around the town of Colmar on the Alsatian Plain. This Colmar Pocket contained the German 19. Armee. As the southernmost corps of Allied forces in northwestern Europe, the French 1st Army Corps now faced the Rhine at Huningue and held Mulhouse and the southern boundary of the Colmar Pocket. A French offensive in mid-December designed to collapse the Colmar Pocket failed for lack of offensive power and the requirement to cover more of the Allied front line as U.S. units were shifted north in response to the Ardennes Offensive. On January 1, 1945, the Germans launched Operation Nordwind, an offensive with the goal of recapturing Alsace. After the U.S. Seventh and French First Armies had held and turned back this offensive, the Allies were ready to reduce the Colmar Pocket once and for all.

The 1st Army Corps led the attack against the Colmar Pocket on January 20, 1945. Fighting in woodlands and dense urban areas, the 1st Army Corps' attack stalled after the first day, meeting a German defense in depth and attracting 19. Armee reinforcements. By the end of the month, however, other attacks by U.S. and French forces against the Colmar Pocket had forced the Germans to redistribute their troops, and an early February attack by the 1st Army Corps moved north through weak German resistance, reaching the bridge over the Rhine at Chalampé and making contact with the U.S. XXI Corps at Rouffach, south of Colmar. The final German forces in the 1st Army Corps' area retreated over the Rhine into Baden on February 9, 1945. Thereafter, the thrust of the Allied offensive moved to the north, and the 1st Army Corps was assigned the defense of the Rhine from the area south of Strasbourg to the Swiss frontier until mid-April 1945.

=== Germany 1945 ===
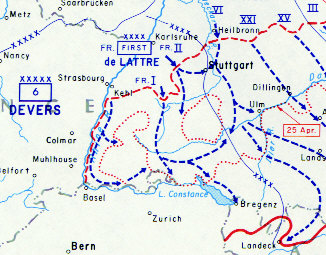
French 1st Army operations, April 15 – May 8, 1945.

On April 15, 1st Army Corps was given the mission of crossing the Rhine, traversing the Black Forest, and sweeping South Baden of German Army troops. The 4^{e} DMM drove directly on Freudenstadt, an important Black Forest road junction, capturing it on April 17, 1945. The 9^{e} DIC, crossing the Rhine north of Karlsruhe, raced south along the east bank of the Rhine and then swung east, paralleling the course of the Swiss frontier. From Freudenstadt, the 4^{e} DMM turned south and met the 9^{e} DIC near Döggingen on April 29, cutting off the German XVIII. SS-Armeekorps in the Black Forest. Frantic attempts at escape by the encircled German troops came to naught among French roadblocks and the formidable terrain of the forest, and they were left no options save death or surrender.

From Freudenstadt, elements of the 1^{re} DB pushed east and south, capturing Ulm on April 24, and then pushed south again with elements of the 2^{e} DIM into the Alps, crossing into Austria and marching into Sankt-Anton on May 7, 1945. Elements of the 5^{e} DB and the 4^{e} DMM drove southeast along the north shore of Lake Constance, capturing Bregenz and then turning east toward Sankt-Anton. The following day was VE Day, ending Allied military operations in Europe.

During the course of its operations in France and Germany in 1944 - 1945, the 1st Army Corps lost 3,518 men killed, 13,339 wounded, and 1,449 missing, for a total of 18,306 casualties. Although not all casualties inflicted on the Germans by 1st Army Corps are known, the corps is credited with taking 101,556 Germans prisoner during the campaigns to liberate France and invade Germany.

=== Commanders in WW II ===
- 2 September 1939 – 2 July 1940 : Général Sciard
- 2–10 July 1940 : Général Trancart
- .—
- 30 August 1943 – 10 August 1944 : Général Martin
- 10 August 1944 – 8 July 1945 : Général Béthouart
- 1 September 1945 – 6 June 1946 : Général Sevez

== Postwar ==
After VE Day, the 1st Army Corps occupied Baden along with parts of Württemberg and Austria as the French occupation zone in Germany, with corps headquarters initially in Ravensburg. On July 16, 1945, the 1st Army Corps was renamed "Army Corps of the South" (French: Corps d'armée sud). General Béthouart became the commander of French forces in Austria and the High Commissioner for France in Austria until 1950. 1st Army Corps was inactivated on April 30, 1946.

It was reformed later during the Cold War, with corps headquarters being at Nancy in 1970. In 1977, the corps was fused with the 6th Military Region, and the artillery commandant took up quarters in the Chateau of Mercy (Ars-Laquenexy). Genérals Faverdin, Bonmati, D'Hulst, BARASCUD, MARTINIE and DELISSNYDER succeeded him there. By 1984 the corps headquarters and military region HQ had been split again.

From circa 1965 to 1978 the corps included the 8th Division (with 4th and 14th Brigades) until the 8th Division, later the 8th Armoured Division, was disestablished in the small divisions reorganisation of the late 1970s.

The 10th Armoured Division was created on 1 August 1977 at Châlons-en-Champagne (part of Châlons-sur-Marne (at that time)). It formed part of the 1st Army Corps.

In 1989 it had its HQ at Metz with the 1st Armoured Division at Trier (Germany), the 7th Armoured Division at Besançon, 12th Light Armoured Division at Saumur, and the 14th Light Armoured Division at Montpellier. The headquarters staff of the 12e Division légère blindée was to be mobilized in time of war from the Armoured and Cavalry Branch Training School headquarters in Saumur.

The corps was again disbanded in 1990, seemingly on 1 July 1990.

On 1 January 2026, the Rapid Reaction Corps – France became the 1st Army Corps.
