= Mouilly =

- Commune
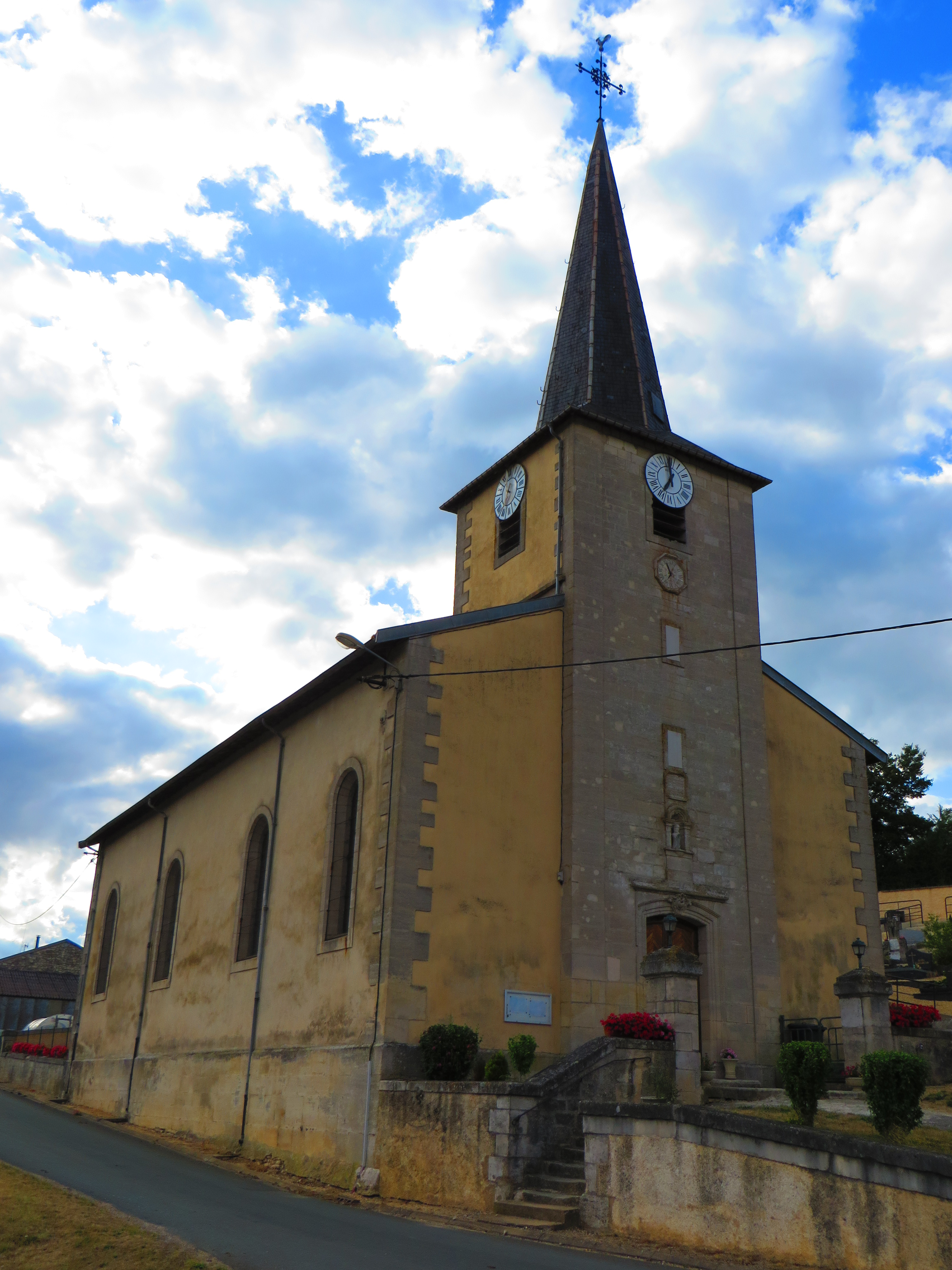
- The church in Mouilly
- Location of Mouilly
- Location within France Location within Grand Est
- Coordinates: 49°03′05″N 5°32′02″E
- Country: France
- Region: Grand Est
- Department: Meuse
- Arrondissement: Verdun
- Canton: Étain
- Intercommunality: Territoire de Fresnes-en-Woëvre

Government
  - Mayor (2020–2026): Mickaël Adam
- Area^{1}: 10.96 km^{2} (4.23 sq mi)
- Elevation: 302 m (991 ft)
- Highest elevation: 382 m (1,253 ft)
- Lowest elevation: 257 m (843 ft)
- Population (2023): 105
  - Density: 9.58/km^{2} (24.8/sq mi)
- Time zone: UTC+01:00 (CET)
  - Summer (DST): UTC+02:00 (CEST)
- INSEE/Postal code: 55360 /55320
- ^{1} French Land Register data, which excludes lakes, ponds, glaciers > 1 km^{2} (0.386 sq mi or 247 acres) and river estuaries.

Mouilly (French pronunciation: [muji]) is a commune in the Meuse department in Grand Est in north-eastern France.

== See also ==
- Communes of the Meuse department
- Parc naturel régional de Lorraine
