= 2nd Infantry Division (France) =

Inactive French Army unit

- 2e Division d'Infanterie
- Active: 1815–1940
- Country: France
- Branch: French Army
- Type: Infantry division
- Engagements: Napoleonic Wars: Hundred Days; 1870 War; First World War; Second World War

The French 2nd Infantry Division (French: 2e Division d'Infanterie, 2e DI) was one of the oldest divisions of the French army.

== Heads of the 2nd Infantry Division ==
- 22 March 1815: Division General Donzelot
- .
- 1870: General Martineau des Chenez
- .
- 18 October 1873: General Bellecourt
- 18 November 1878 – 10 January 1880: General Blot
- .
- 28 February 1880 – 14 September 1880: General de Courcy
- 11 November 1880: General Vilmette
- 11 January 1882: General Bardin
- 17 July 1887 – 24 February 1891: General Mathelin
- .
- 4 April 1891 – 4 November 1891: General Swiney
- 11 November 1891 – 9 January 1892: General Peting de Vaulgrenant
- .
- 24 May 1894 – 26 October 1899: General Strohl
- 28 October 1899 – 11 May 1905: General de Germiny
- .
- 17 June 1905: General Bertrand
- 30 September 1905: General de Chomer
- 25 March 1906: General Durand
- 20 July 1907 – 31 May 1908: General de Chomer
- .
- 17 June 1908 – 18 July 1911: General Cramezel de Kerhué
- 28 July 1911 – 20 March 1914: General Bizart
- .
- 2 August 1914: General Deligny
- 8 September 1914: Colonel Garnier-Duplessix
- 21 September 1914: General Brulard
- 16 July 1915: General Guignadaudet
- 17 June 1917 – 15 July 1920: General Mignot
- .
- 27 August 1940 – 10 November 1940: General Etcheberrigarray

== The Hundred Days ==
Schmitz brigade, commanded by Brigade General Nicolas Schmitz.

13th Light Infantry Regiment
17th Line Infantry Regiment

Aulard brigade, commanded by Brigade General Pierre Aulard.

19th Line Infantry Regiment
51st Line Infantry Regiment

10th company of the 6th Foot Artillery Regiment, with 8 troops.

== 1870 War ==
The division was part of the Rhine Army, commanded by Marshall Mac Mahon.

Composition :

50th Line Infantry Regiment
74th Line Infantry Regiment
78th Line Infantry Regiment
1st Algerian Tirailleur Regiment

After the dissolution of the Imperial Army, it joined the new Armée de la Loire, commanded by General Louis d'Aurelle de Paladines.

2nd Infantry Division : General Martineau des Chenez

1st Brigade : General Dariés

5th Marching Battalion: Commandant Chamard
39th Line Regiment: Colonel Jouffroy
Foreign Legion : Lieutenant-Colonel de Curten
25th Mobile Regiment (Gironde) : Lieutenant-Colonel d'Artigolles

2nd Brigade : General Rébillard

2nd Zouave Regiment: Lieutenant-Colonel Logerot
30th Marching Regiment: Lieutenant-Colonel Bernard de Seigneurens
29th Mobile Regiment (Maine-et-Loire): Lieutenant-Colonel de Paillot

Artillery :

18th battery of the 9th Regiment: Captain Pariaud
18th battery of the 12th Regiment: Captain Grosclerc
14th battery of the Mounted Guard Regiment: Captain Chastang
Engineers : 2nd section of the 19th company of the 3rd Regiment

== First World War ==
=== Composition during the War ===
The 2nd Infantry Division was mobilised in the 1st Military Region in August 1914. Its infantry was originally organized as two brigades. In November 1916, the division was triangularized. The two regiments of the 3rd Brigade were sent to the 51st Infantry Division, while those of the 4th Brigade, and the newly attached 208th (which came from the 51st Division) went directly under divisional command.

Infantry

3rd Brigade

33rd Infantry Regiment from August 1914 to November 1916
73rd Infantry Regiment from August 1914 to November 1916

4th Brigade

8th Infantry Regiment from August 1914 to armistice (under direct divisional control from November 1916)
110th Infantry Regiment from August 1914 to armistice (under direct divisional control from November 1916)

208th Infantry Regiment from November 1916 to armistice
A battalion of pioneers from the 72nd Territorial Infantry Regiment from August 1918 to armistice

Artillery

27th Field Artillery Regiment from the mobilisation to armistice

122nd battery from July 1916 to January 1918
101st battery from January 1918 to armistice
6th Artillery Group from 15 June 1918 to armistice

Cavalry

1st Squadron/6th Chasseur Regiment from mobilisation to armistice

Engineers

3rd Engineers Regiment

1/2 Company from mobilisation to armistice
1/2 bis Company from January 1915 to January 1916
1/52 Company from January 1916 to armistice
1/71 Company from January 1917 to armistice

Sappers from the 21st Regiment from January 1916 to January 1917

=== History ===
==== 1914 ====
4–13 August

Transport by railroad to the region of Auvillers-les-Forges and crossing the Meuse to reach Revin and Givet.

13–23 August

Movement, via Olloy, to Dinant.
15 August, combat at Dinant, formed defence in front of the Meuse, via Dinant and Anbée.
22 August, movement towards Charleroi.

23–29 August

Engaged in the Battle of Charleroi, via Saint-Gérard.
24 August, return, via Couvin, to the region of Guise
26 August, combat at Gué-d'Hossus.

29 August – 6 September

Engaged in the 1st Battle of Guise; combat at Sains-Richaumont.
30 August, return, via Crécy-sur-Serre, Pontavert and Baizil, to the South of Esternay.

6–13 September

Engaged in the 1st Battle of the Marne.
6–10 September, Battle of Deux Morins : Combat in Esternay, Bergères-sous-Montmirail and Fontaine-Chacun.
10 September, continue, via Verneuil and Ville-Dommange, until Reims.

13 September – 12 December

Engaged in the 1st Battle of Aisne : combat in the region of Bétheny, la Neuvillette.
16 September, movement along the road heading North-West; combat at Cholera Farm and towards la Ville-aux-Bois. Stabilisation and occupation of a sector towards Gernicourt and Beau marais Forest, heading left, on 15 October, until the moulin Pontoy, and to the right, on 1 November, until cote 108
12–14 October, French attack on Cholera Farm and the Ville-aux-Bois Forest.
4 November, attack and capture of Sapigneul.
11 November, capture of cote 108.

12 December 1914 – 12 January 1915

Retreat from the front towards Fismes.
16 December, transport by van to Cuperly.
20 December or thereabouts, movement to La Cheppe, heading to Laval, to take part in the 1st Battle of Champagne: Engaged on 9 January 1915, North of Mesnil-lès-Hurlus.

==== 1915 ====
12–20 January

Retreat from the front and back to Bussy-le-Château.

20 January – 2 March

Occupation of the sector towards Mesnil-lès-Hurlus
16 March, French attack on les Mamelles, leading to violent combat in the region (Battle of Champagne)

2 March – 5 April

Retrait from the front and back to Courtisols (arriving 14 March)
20 and 21 March, movement to the region of Avize; rest.
29 March, transport by van towards Vavincourt, then, at the end of 1st April, movement towards the South-East of Verdun.

5–11 April

Engaged in the 1st Battle of la Woëvre, towards Buzy Forest and the East of Braquis.

11–29 April

Retreat from the front (arriving on 18th); further movement, via Souilly and Les Hauts-de-Chée, to Commercy.

29 April – 11 May

Movement towards the front; 30 April, attack on Ailly Forest, leading to occupation of a sector towards Ailly Forest
5 May, German attack, and French counter-attack.

11–15 May

Retreat from the front, and transport by van to the regions of Épernay and Fismes.

15 May – 3 September

Movement towards the front and occupation of a sector of Berry-au-Bac and the moulin Pontoy, reduced to the right, on 18 August, to la Miette, then, on 31 August, up to la Ville-aux-Bois.

3 September – 2 October

Retreat from the front, and rest at Guyencourt.

2 October 1915 – 12 February 1916

Movement to the front, and occupation of a sector of Sapigneul and la Miette.
12 November, movement along the road, and occupation of a new sector between Berry-au-Bac and Temple Farm, extended to the left, on 20 November, up to the Pontoy windmill:
Battle of Mines at cote 108.

==== 1916 ====
12–21 February

Retreat from the front and regrouping at Ville-en-Tardenois; rest and instruction.

21 February – 8 March

Transport by train, movement to the region of Verdun.
26 February, engaged by accident in the Battle of Verdun, at Douaumont (violent combat)

8 March – 14 April

Retreat from the front and rest at Bar-le-Duc.
1st April, transport by van to the region of Dormans; rest.
11 April, movement to Fismes.

14 April – 24 July

Occupation of a sector between the road from Paissy to Chermizy-Ailles and Soupir, reduced to the right on 17 July up to Troyon.

24 July – 3 September

Retreat from the front and rest at Ville-en-Tardenois.
7 August, transport by truck to the region of Conty.
Rest south-west of Amiens until 25 August, towards Corbie.

3 September – 5 October

Movement to the front; engaged in the Battle of the Somme, towards le Forest and the Forest of Maurepas
14 September, capture of Priez farm.
19–26 September, capture of the 2nd line (further battles in the area, and the capture of Combles, on the 26th)
27 September, again engaged, towards Combles and Morval, leading to Combles and Frégicourt (former municipality reunited with Combles in 1834).

5–9 October

Retreat from the front and rest at Conty.

9–16 October

Transport by van to the region of Châlons-sur-Marne and rest at Somme-Vesle.

16 October – 30 November

Movement to the front and occupation of a sector at Maisons de Champagne and the butte du Mesnil.

30 November – 14 December

Retreat from the front, and rest at Possesse.

14 December 1916 – 6 January 1917

Movement to the camp at Mailly, rest and instruction.

==== 1917 ====
6 January – 27 February

Gradual movement to the front, while occupying a sector covering Maisons de Champagne and la Courtine
15 February, violent German attack.

21 February – 6 March

Retreat from the front, movement through the region of Sainte-Menehould, via Dampierre-le-Château, l'Épine, Sarry, Athis and Vinay.

6 March – 8 April

Movement via Dormans; instruction (work at the Aisne)

8–19 April

Movement to the front and occupation of a sector covering Craonne and le Ployron.
16 April, engaged in the 2nd Battle of the Aisne : combat on the Craonne plateau; defence, and organisation of their captured positions.

19 April – 7 July

Retreat from the front and rest at Ventelay; from 25 April, rest at Viels-Maisons.
9 May, gradual movement towards the camp at Mailly; rest and instruction.
15 June, gradual movement towards Provins; rest and instruction.

7–30 July

Transport by van to Flandres.
14 July, movement of the infantry to the front and occupation of a sector covering Het-Sas (under the orders of the 1st D.I.)

30 July – 4 August

Retrait from the front; rest in the region of Roesbrugge-Haringe.

4–22 August

Mouvement towards the front and rest in the region of Bikschote
16 August, offensive against Martje Vaert and Broenbeck (Battle of Langemarck – part of the Battle of Passchendaele)

22 August – 6 October

Retreat from the front; rest and instruction in the region of West-Cappel.

6–16 October

Occupation of a sector north of Bixschoote and Langemark (together with the British Army) :
9 October, offensive in the forest of Houthulst, attack on Mangelaare (part of the Battle of Poelcappelle).

16 October – 21 November

Retreat from the front, then rest, instruction and work at Bergues.

21 November – 7 December

Occupation of a sector north of Langemarck and Kloosterschool (together with the British front)

7 December 1917 – 17 January 1918

Retreat from the front (relieved by the British Army). Rest at Gravelines.
11 December, gradual movement to the region of Senlis; rest.

==== 1918 ====
17 January – 20 March

Gradual movement to Soissons
22 January, work on the 2nd position in the region.
8 February, gradual movement towards Roucy; then work on the 2nd position in the region.

20–31 March

Movement towards the front and occupation of a sector in the region of Miette, Ployon.

31 March – 20 May: Retreat from the front; movement towards Fismes, and, on 3 April, towards Écuiry; rest.

14 April, bridging the Oise towards Choisy-au-Bac.
2 May, movement towards Warluis; rest. Led to work on the 2nd position in the region of Beauvais.

20–31 May

Movement towards Marseille-en-Beauvaisis.
28 May, transport by train south to Compiègne.
Soon afterwards, to Montigny-Lengrain, to join the Third Battle of the Aisne.

31 May – 18 July

Movement to the front and occupation of a sector covering Dammard and Troësnes: frequent local actions, particularly on 29, 30 June and 1 July, to the east of Mosloy.

18–27 July

Engaged, at Troësnes to the south, in the Battle of soissonnais et l'Ourq (Second Battle of the Marne)
Progression towards Épaux-Bézu and through the region of Rocourt-Saint-Martin northward.

27 July – 19 August

Retreat from the front; movement towards Mareuil-sur-Ourcq, then to Pierrefonds; rest.

19–29 August

Movement to Vic-sur-Aisne and occupation of a sector north of Autrêches.
Engaged in the 2nd Battle of Noyon, at l'Ailette, via Pont-Saint-Mard.

29 August – 11 September

Retreat from the front and rest at Pont-Sainte-Maxence.

11 September – 28 October

Transport via van to Alsace; from 15 September, occupation of a sector covering Burnhaupt-le-Haut and Leimbach.

28 October – 11 November

Retreat from the front and gradual movement to Ceintrey; preparing offensive.

=== Hierarchy ===
The division was part of the 1^{ier} Corps d'Armée from mobilisation in August 1914 until the Armistice of 11 November 1918.

== The Second World War ==
Under the order of battle of 10 May 1940, the 2nd Infantry Division joined the Colonial Army Corps (with the 51st (Highland) Infantry Division and the 56th (London) Infantry Division), under the command of General Condé of the Third French Army.

Structure of the division in 1939:

- Chief of Staff, 2nd Infantry Division – Major Villate
- Components, 2nd Infantry Division
  - 33rd Infantry Regiment
  - 73rd Infantry Regiment
  - 127th Infantry Regiment
  - 34th Divisional Artillery Regiment
  - 234th Division Heavy Artillery Regiment
