= Capture of Combles =

Battle during the First World War

- Part of The Battle of the Somme, First World War
- Battle of the Somme 1 July – 18 November 1916
Date	25–26 September 1916
Location	Picardy, France 50°00′36″N 02°51′58″E
Result	British–French victory

Belligerents
British Empire; France	Germany

Commanders and leaders
Douglas Haig; Joseph Joffre	Erich von Falkenhayn

Strength
British: 2 brigades French: 1 regiment	3 regiments
- Combles is a commune in the Somme department of Picardie, northern France

The Capture of Combles (25 September 1916) was a tactical incident that took place during the Battle of Morval, part of the Battle of the Somme, during the First World War. Combles lies 30 mi (48 km) north-east of Amiens and 10 mi (16 km) east of Albert, on the D 20 Rancourt–Guillemont road, 8 mi (13 km) south of Bapaume, in the Combles valley a hollow between outcrops of Bazentin Ridge, between Morval to the north, Ginchy to the north-west and Falfemont Farm to the west. North of the village the valley widens into a basin, which forks north-east around the Morval Spur. In late September 1914, military operations took place in the vicinity, when the II Bavarian Corps was engaged by French Territorial divisions in an encounter battle. The French divisions were forced back and the two divisions of the II Bavarian Corps, advanced westwards on the north side of the Somme, eventually being stopped around Maricourt, Montauban and Fricourt.

Combles became a backwater until 1916, when it was used as a shelter for reserves, supplies and engineer stores and a staging area for reinforcements. Gallwitz Riegel the German third defensive position, being built as the Battle of the Somme began, ran close behind the village. Combles was attacked by the British and French on 25 September, during the Battle of Morval, after several delays due to rain and poor visibility. Brigades from the 56th (1/1st London) Division and the 5th Division in the north, wheeled to the right to form a south-facing flank above Combles, as the French 2nd Division attacked from the south. The British attack swiftly established the defensive flank and patrols began to probe southwards. German resistance against the French attack close to the village, particularly with machine-gun fire, held back the advance.

Further to the east, the French captured Rancourt in the afternoon and closed up to Frégicourt. Prisoners taken by the British and French revealed that a retirement from the village was intended during the night and a constant Anglo-French artillery barrage was maintained on the exits. Infantry patrols probed forwards and the British and French forces met at several points in and east of the village in the early hours of 26 September. A huge amount of equipment, ammunition and engineering stores were captured in the village and on 27 September, the inter-army boundary was moved north to Morval, to assist French attacks towards Sailly-Saillisel. On 24 March 1918, Combles was recaptured by German troops, during the retreat of the 9th (Scottish) Division in Operation Michael, the German spring offensive. The village was recaptured for the last time on 29 August, by the 18th (Eastern) Division, during the Second Battle of Bapaume.

== Background ==
=== 1914 ===
Combles lies 10 mi (16 km) east of Albert on the D 20 Rancourt–Guillemont road and 8 mi (13 km) south of Bapaume. Morval lies to the north, Ginchy to the north-west and Falfemont Farm to the west. The village lies in a hollow between outcrops of Bazentin Ridge. On 25 September 1914, the French 11th Division advanced on the north side of the Somme towards Combles and Péronne, against increasing artillery and machine-gun fire. Next day, German attacks by the II Bavarian Corps (General Karl Ritter von Martini) attacked westwards on the north bank of the Somme, with the 4th Bavarian Division, which had pushed back French territorial divisions around Bapaume, in an encounter battle and left flank guards facing north. The division advanced through Sailly, Combles, Guilemont and Montauban. To the south, closer to the Somme, the 3rd Bavarian Division advanced through Bouchavesnes, Le Foret and Hardecourt, where the arrival of the XI Corps of the new French Tenth Army during 28 September, slowed the Bavarian advance and next day, stopped the Bavarians east of Albert.

=== 1916 ===
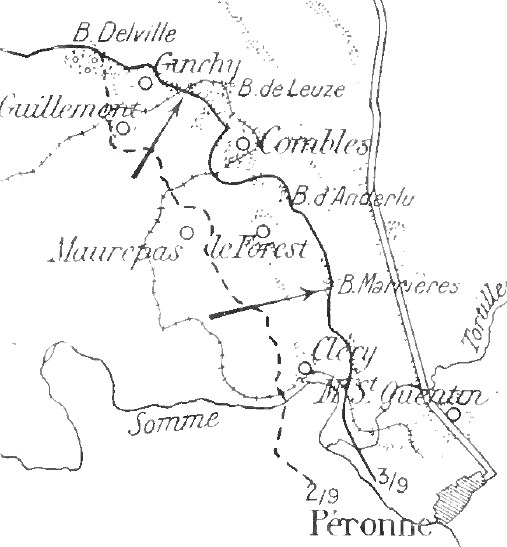
French and British advances on the flanks of Combles, 3–9 September 1916

On 22 July, reconnaissance aircraft from 9 Squadron Royal Flying Corps (RFC) flew over the German defences from Combles to Gueudecourt and reported that they were formidable but unoccupied. The village was bombarded with 3,000 heavy shells on the night of 24/25 July and next day an ammunition train in the station was hit and blew up. Late on 2 September, troops of the 111th Division, at readiness in Combles, were called forward to counter-attack towards Guillemont. The French Sixth Army attacked on the north bank of the Somme, from 3 to 4 September and I Corps with the 1st Division (Général Élie de Riols de Fonclare) and the 2nd Division (Général Pierre Guignadaudet) on the northern flank, next to the British Fourth Army, took high ground south of Combles and established a foothold in Bois Douage. On 4 September, German counter-attacks on the Combles ravine, south-west of the village, were repulsed and I Corps made a slight advance north-east, from Le Forêt towards Rancourt. The British capture of Falfemont Farm on 5 September enabled the two armies to link across the Combles ravine. French patrols advanced south-east of the village and captured Ferme de l'Hôpital, just east of Le Forêt.

Rainstorms, disorganisation behind the front line and chronic supply difficulties, forced the Sixth Army to stop operations until 12 September, during which many French divisions were relieved. The I Corps commander, General Adolphe Guillaumat, ordered that bogged and broken down vehicles be thrown off the roads and supplies carried forward in daylight. By 6 September, I Corps had screened Combles using the Maurepas–Frégicourt road and on 12 September, attacked Rancourt. The 2nd Division captured Bois d'Anderlou and broke into the German defences north-west of Marrières Wood, with the right flank facing Rancourt and Sailly-Saillisel; further south, Bouchavesnes was captured by Infantry Regiment 44 (IR 44) and IR 133. On 13 September the French closed on Rancourt and Ferme du Priez between Rancourt and Combles, took the farm next day and made a small advance towards Rancourt. The I Corps artillery began a bombardment at dawn on 15 September in support of the British XIV Corps; French infantry attacked at 3:00 p.m. on the left near Combles and tried to bomb into Bois Douage. On the right a small advance was made near Le Priez Farm but an attack on Rancourt was repulsed by German artillery and machine-gun fire.

On 16 September, the artillery of the Sixth Army continued counter-battery fire and the infantry prepared to follow up in case of a German retirement. During the evening of 18 September, surprise attacks by I Corps advanced a short distance south and south-east of Combles but the relief of exhausted divisions was necessary before the main offensive was resumed with the British on 21 September (inclement weather led to postponements until 25 September). German artillery fire continued despite the rain and counter-attacks were conducted around Rancourt and Bouchavesnes. By mid-September, Combles had been outflanked on the north side by the British advance into Leuze Wood and on 20 September, the 52nd Reserve Division was pushed back further. Two days later, French troops drove back the 213th Division on the southern flank of the 51st Reserve Division and captured a sugar refinery south of the village.

== Prelude ==
=== British-French offensive preparations ===
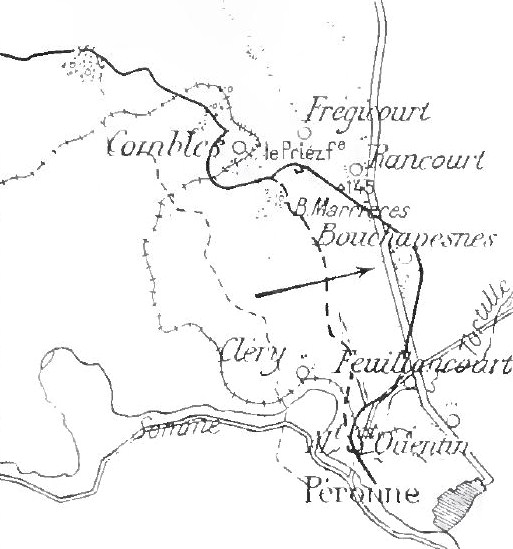
French attacks south of Combles, 12 September, Somme 1916

The British conformed to the French preference for afternoon attacks, which meant that the final bombardment would take place in daylight. The British preferred dawn attacks to avoid the attacking infantry waiting for too long in the front-line, vulnerable to German counter-bombardment. Tank policy had been decided at a meeting on 19 September, where the vulnerability of tanks waiting in advanced positions from dawn to zero hour, led to a decision by the Fourth Army commander, General Henry Rawlinson to keep them in reserve, ready to advance if they were needed. The XIV Corps commander, Major-General Lord Cavan, put all four divisions of the corps in line, to give them narrower fronts, the easier to deploy supporting infantry. The German defences on the flanks were too close for an artillery bombardment and the corps substituted a Stokes mortar and machine-gun barrage to begin at zero hour. At 5:50 a.m. on 24 September, the 1/9th Battalion London Regiment of the 169th Brigade, 56th (1/1st London) Division, bombed down Combles Trench towards the French 73rd Regiment, as it attacked from the south-east towards the British but German reinforcements forced the bombers back to their start line.

The 95th Brigade of the 5th Division held the right flank of a 2,000 yd (1,800 m) front from the north edge of Bouleaux Wood on the east slope of Ginchy–Telegraph Hill, on the left of the 56th (1/1st London) Division which held the line in Bouleaux Wood. German posts had been dug on the near side of the valley and dug-outs in the light railway embankment were held by infantry and machine-guns. The 56th (1/1st London) Division was to form a defensive flank facing south-east over Combles. During the night, two tanks allotted to the division moved forward to rendezvous in the quarry west of Leuze Wood. All three brigades of the division were in line, the 169th Brigade on the right between Combles and Leuze Wood, the 167th Brigade in the centre along Beef and Bully trenches and the 168th Brigade on the left in Middle Copse and in new trenches being dug ready to envelop Bouleaux Wood. The 1/4th London, the right-hand battalion of the 168th Brigade, was to clear the northern end of Bouleaux Wood and to establish a line of posts overlooking the ravine, while the London Scottish on the left continued the defensive flank in the direction of Morval.

From 19 to 20 September, the pioneer battalion 1/5th Cheshire Regiment dug Gropi Trench, a connexion between Beef Trench and Middle Copse covered by the London Scottish who captured several German troops of II Battalion, Reserve Infantry Regiment 235, extended two trenches to the light railway and linked the copse to the Quadrilateral, which made a jumping-off line 900 yd (820 m) long facing Combles and Bouleaux Wood. At 4:30 p.m. on 24 September, the 4th Battalion of the London Regiment (Royal Fusiliers) marched from Casement Trench to assembly trenches in the Gropi–Ranger system and Middle Copse. The obliteration of landmarks confused some guides but Middle Copse was eventually reached. Gropi Trench gave good cover from snipers, who were active from the direction of Bouleaux Wood during the morning. From 15 to 16 September the weather was dry, then rain fell from 17 to 21 September, 22–25 September was dry and slight rain fell from 26 to 28 September.

=== Franco-British plan of attack ===
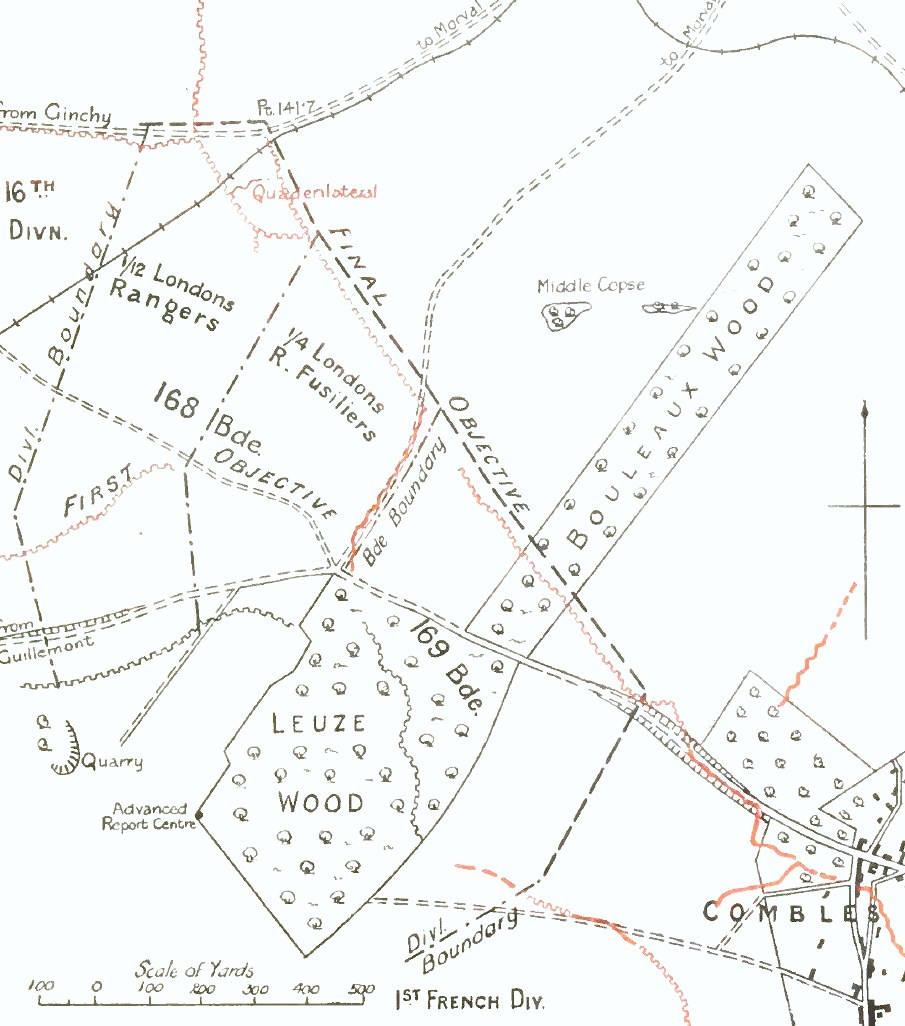
56th (1/1st London) Division operations around Leuze Wood, 15–24 September 1916

The French Sixth Army planned to attack from the Somme north to Combles, in which I Corps would capture Frégicourt and Sailly-Saillisel and XXXII Corps would take Rancourt, the west end of St Pierre Vaast Wood and Saillisel. The 56th (1/1st London) Division was to mask Bouleaux Wood and reach trenches to the north-east and the right-hand brigade of the 5th Division was to advance from the second objective to Morval with four 30-minute halts, gaining touch with the left of the 56th (1/1st London) Division. The 56th (1/1st London) Division was to guard the southern flank of the Fourth Army during the attacks on Morval, Lesbœufs and Gueudecourt planned for 25 September, by capturing positions at the northern corner of Bouleaux Wood which commanded the valley north-east of Combles.

The division was to extend the flank opposite Combles to neutralise the German defences in Bouleaux Wood, cut the tramline which looped around the north end of the wood and gain touch with the 5th Division on the left. The 168th Brigade objectives were trenches between the wood and tramline and German dugouts along the cutting and bank of the line. The 167th Brigade was to fire machine-gun and Stokes mortar barrages at the wood and the 169th Brigade was to fire on the north and north-east exists of the village. Local liaison between the 56th (1/1st London) Division and the French 2nd Division (General Pierre Guignadaudet) was to be maintained by the divisional commander, Major-General Charles Hull, for a combined attack on the village on 26 September, if necessary. Infantry supported by two tanks were to advance from Bouleaux Wood as the French advanced from the south, depending on the resistance of the German defenders.

=== German defensive preparations ===
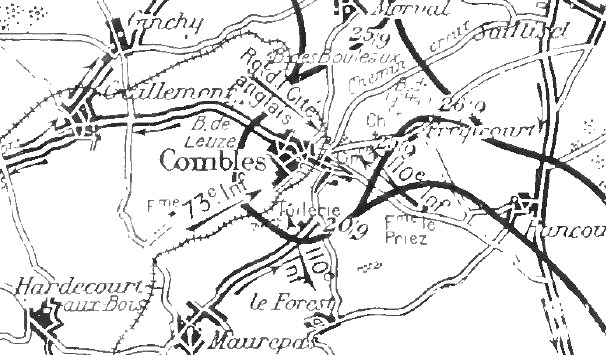
French operations against German defensive lines around Combles, September 1916

On the German right flank the XXVI Reserve Corps took over the Combles area on 3 September, with the 52nd Reserve Division on the right, the 51st Reserve Division held Morval with the Reserve Infantry Regiment 236 and the ground further south with Reserve Infantry Regiment 235. Reserve Infantry Regiment 234 held the village but losses had reduced the front line strength of the division to 1,200 men with a few machine-guns. Allied bombardments had destroyed trenches, dug outs, barbed wire and communications links and to avoid observation by aircraft the German troops had dispersed among shell-holes. During the day, Allied artillery directed by the crews of artillery-observation aircraft overwhelmed the 18 field artillery batteries and 56 heavy guns in the area. There were no rear defence lines and the transport of supplies to the front line could only take place at night. The divisional commander Generalleutnant William Balck, stressed that the defenders should co-operate closely with flanking units and the artillery and use hasty counter-attacks to recover lost ground and requested frequent reports delivered by all means possible. A new trench line was dug on a reverse slope east of Frégicourt and Rancourt, connecting Morval with the west end of St Pierre Vaast Wood and covering Sailly-Saillisel and from the wood south-east to Tortille river at Allaines. (Note: On 7 September, a British RSM who had been taken prisoner, said that he had gone for a walk in the morning, entered Combles and stopped in front of a book stall, before heading north and being stopped by two pioneers near Morval. To the dismay of the XII Reserve Corps commander, General Hans von Kirchbach, the prisoner claimed to have seen no barbed wire or trenches and that the village had been deserted.)

The cessation of German attacks at Verdun, ordered by the new supreme command of Chief of the General Staff, Field Marshal von Hindenburg and Generalquartiermeister General Erich Ludendorff, when they superseded Falkenhayn and the reinforcement of the Somme front, reduced the German inferiority in guns and aircraft on the Somme during September. Field artillery reduced its barrage frontage from 400–200 yd (370–180 m) per battery and increased its accuracy by using one air artillery flight per division, using the aircraft reinforcements from the Verdun front. Colonel Fritz von Loßberg, Chief of Staff of the 2nd Army, was also able to establish Ablösungsdivisionen (relief divisions) 10–15 mi (16–24 km) behind the battlefield, ready to replace front divisions. Loßberg established new positions based on depth, dispersal and camouflage, rather than continuous lines of trenches. Rigid defence of the front-line continued but with as few soldiers as possible, relying on the firepower of machine-guns firing from behind the front-line and from the flanks. Artillery reduced its counter-battery fire and area bombardments before Anglo-French attacks and used the reinforcements from Verdun for destructive fire, observed from balloons and aircraft.

The area behind the front-line was defended by support and reserve units dispersed on reverse slopes, in undulations and in any cover that could be found, so that they could open machine-gun fire by surprise, from unseen positions and then counter-attack swiftly, before the Anglo-French infantry could consolidate captured ground. Local, corps and army reserves were held back, in lines about 2,000 yd (1,800 m) apart, to make progressively stronger counter-attacks. Before an attack the garrison tried to move forwards into shell-holes, to avoid Allied artillery-fire and surprise attacking infantry with machine-gun fire. Opposite the French the Germans dug new defences on a reverse slope between the Tortille stream at Allaines to the west end of St Pierre Vaast Wood and from there to Morval, connected to a new fourth position from Sailly Saillissel to Morval and along the Péronne–Bapaume road. After the Anglo-French attacks in mid-September a "wholesale relief" of the front-line divisions had been possible. The largest German counter-attacks of the Somme battle took place from 20 to 23 September, from the Somme north to St Pierre Vaast Wood and were "destroyed" by French artillery fire. Ludendorff created "new" divisions by combing-out troops at depots and by removing regiments from existing divisions, of which the 212th, 213th and 214th divisions replaced exhausted divisions opposite the French Tenth and Sixth armies.

== Battle ==
=== 25 September ===
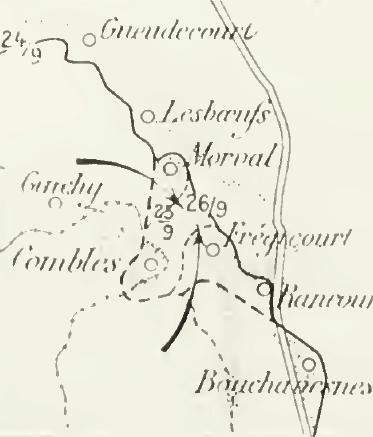
Anglo-French attack at Combles, Somme, 25 September 1916

During the night of 24/25 September the British-French bombardment increased and at 12:30 p.m. on 25 September a hurricane bombardment began as the infantry attacked. The French Sixth Army attacked with seven divisions but the I Corps divisions next to the British Fourth Army involved in the attack on Combles, were held up for most of the day by German machine-gun fire on the left flank south-east of the village. The French reached the Maurepas–Frégicourt road in the centre and on the right flank of I Corps, the 42nd Division of XXXII Corps forced back the 213th Division, closed up to Frégicourt and captured Rancourt in the afternoon; further south the French attacks were repulsed by massed artillery and machine-gun fire.

Anglo-French attacks had been expected by the defenders on 23 September and the timing of the attack for the afternoon of 25 September achieved a measure of surprise. The 51st and 52nd Reserve divisions were quickly pushed back, Reserve Infantry Regiment 239 was broken through and the III Battalion surrounded. Part of Reserve Infantry Regiment 236 was destroyed at the tram line north of Bouleaux Wood, which left Reserve Infantry Regiment 235 west of Combles and Reserve Infantry Regiment 234 in the village, vulnerable to encirclement by the British from the north and the French in the south.

The 56th (1/1st London) Division next to the French 1 Corps, attacked on the front of the 168th Brigade, seven minutes after zero hour, to give time for the 5th Division battalions of the 95th and 15th brigades on the left to draw level. The 1/4th London and the London Scottish advanced behind a creeping barrage fired by batteries in Angle Wood Valley in enfilade towards Bouleaux Wood, which was particularly accurate. The 1/4th London and the London Scottish began to advance steadily at 12:42 p.m., with C Company leading in two waves, fifty paces apart, followed by D Company in similar formation. B Company was to conform to the advance and protect the Brigade right flank against a German riposte from the southern half of Bouleaux Wood. A Company was held in reserve to move forward to the vacant trenches of the assaulting companies. The 1/4th London reached its objectives in the northern fringe of the wood with little opposition and few casualties, killing a large number of Germans in shell hole positions on the western edge. German troops ran back over the open hillside near Combles, only to be shot down from the left flank, by Lewis gunners of the London Scottish. Consolidation of strong points began but was hampered by sniper fire, from farther south in the wood, which continued through the night, as the 167th Brigade on the right flank had not advanced all the way through the wood.

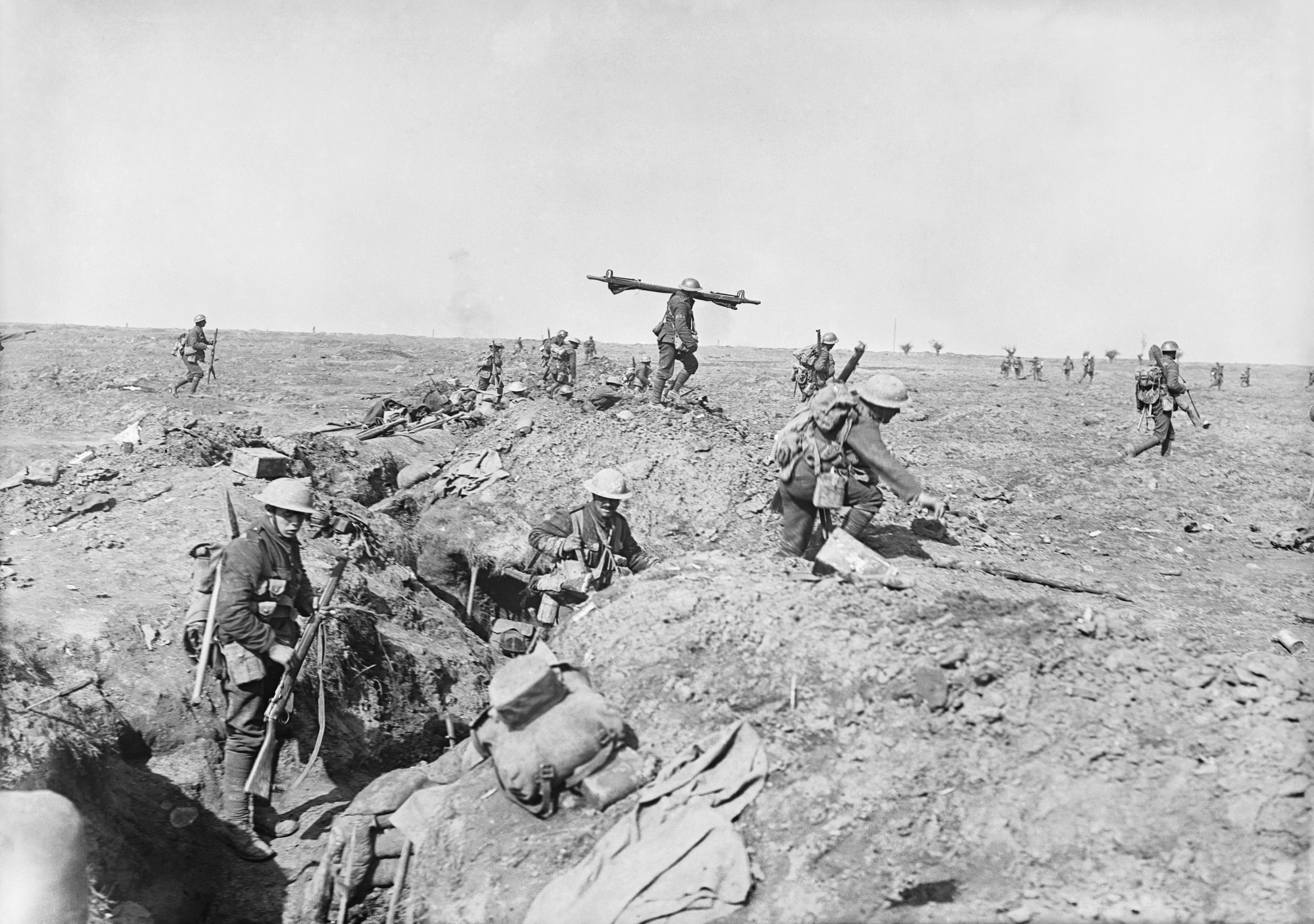
British infantry advance on Morval, 25 September 1916.

North of the 56th (1/1st London) Division, the 95th Brigade of the 5th Division was delayed by enfilade machine-gun fire from the embankment north of the tramline in the 56th (1/1st London) Division area and a strong point on the Ginchy–Morval road, until bombed from the north. The 95th Brigade then resumed its advance up the far slope and rushed the German trench running south from Morval, as the 15th Brigade overran the trench further north, just short of the village, taking many more prisoners. After another halt to reorganise, the village was occupied by the 15th Brigade at 3:00 p.m.. The final objective from theMoulin de Morval windmill south to the 56th (1/1st London) Division area was consolidated by nightfall. Several weak German counter-attacks were defeated and the 95th Brigade began working its way south towards the French at Frégicourt.

The London Scottish captured a trench from the wood to the light railway and then engaged by German troops in the railway embankment, until the position was rushed by the 5th Division from the north and the London Scottish arrived to join in the mopping-up of dugouts occupied by the survivors. By 1:30 p.m. the area had been cleared and 80 prisoners taken from Reserve Infantry Regiment 236. The London Scottish pressed on and captured another trench, which had only been discovered on air reconnaissance photographs the day before and from which was an excellent view over the Combles–Morval valley. No sign was yet seen of French troops moving north from the area of Frégicourt, who were to join with British troops at the crossroads east of Morval and patrols further forward were limited by the British protective barrage. By 3:00 p.m. the XIV Corps divisions had overrun the last of the German defensive lines on a frontage of 2,000 yd (1,800 m) and artillery observers reported that German field artillery batteries and parties of German soldiers were retreating eastwards, from the area either side of Morval as the 5th Division occupied a spur east of the village. Reports from contact patrol aircraft reached the Fourth Army headquarters by 5:30 p.m. giving the approximate position of the attacking troops and after thirty minutes Cavan contradicted French claims to have captured Frégicourt.

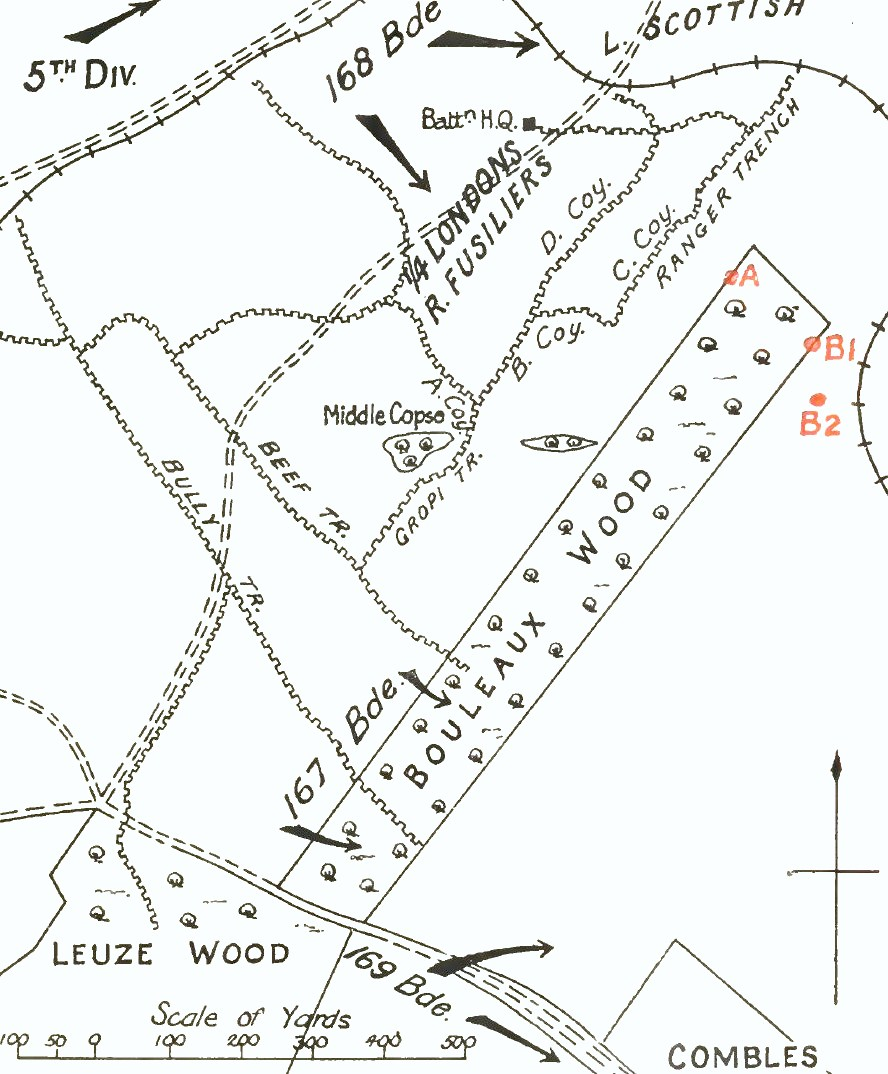
168th Brigade attack on Bouleaux Wood, 25 September 1916

The 1/1st London skirmished with the German garrison in the wood around a derelict tank and further to the right the 1/5th London (London Rifle Brigade) and the 1/9th London (Queen Victoria's Rifles) kept the German troops in the sunken road to Combes and Combles Trench pinned down. Two tanks attached to the 56th (1/1st London) Division, remained at an assembly point in a dip west of Leuze Wood and the three allotted to the 5th Division followed up the advance but two bogged down and the third was sent back from Morval. By midnight the 168th Brigade had established observation posts with an excellent view over the northern exits of Combles and the brigade was directed to work round the north side of Combles and cut off the route to Morval. The 167th Brigade had advanced past the derelict tank and entered the wood and all the sunken road and Combles Trench had been captured by the 169th Brigade.

At 10:40 p.m. a party from the London Scottish began to probe south along the light railway towards Combles and by dawn was within 500 yd (460 m). At 3:30 a.m. the Rifle Brigade entered Combles and met French troops and as dawn broke the 56th (1/1st London) Division began to consolidate a new line 1,500 yd (1,400 m) east of Combles, with the Germans beyond in Mutton Trench. A further attack was planned with tank support then cancelled when the tanks failed to appear. A narrow gap remained through which the German garrison could escape and for the rest of the night, the 56th (1/1st London) Division artillery fired a barrage at the exit to catch the fleeing troops. The German garrison began to withdraw from the village at 8:30 p.m. and by 10:00 p.m. most of the troops had escaped and improvised a new line west of Sailly.

=== Air operations ===
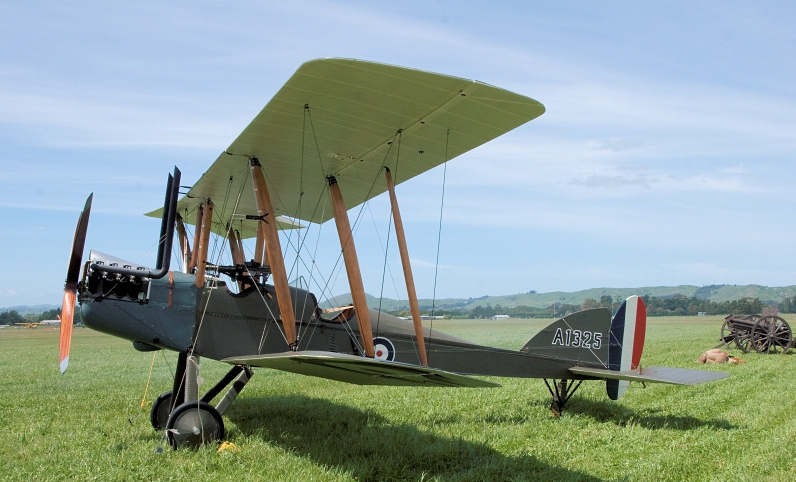
B.E.2f A1325, in 2009 (ZK-BFR IMG 3379-Edit)

25 September dawned bright and cloudless, with a ground haze but reports from contact patrol observers were notably accurate, as the infantry advanced to their objectives on the Fourth Army front, from Morval to Gueudecourt and around Flers. Ground at the south-east edge of Morval was captured in the evening, completing the occupation of the ground on the main ridge and making Combles untenable, although British balloon observers could see that the French advance from the south had been delayed at Frégicourt. After a captured German officer disclosed that Combles was to be evacuated during the night, British artillery bombarded the valley to the east of the village. In the early hours of the morning, British troops entered the north end of Combles as French troops advanced from the south. The position of the ground forces was reported at noon by a reconnaissance crew, who returned at 2:20 p.m. to observe the position of the new line but at 3:00 p.m. were hit by an anti-aircraft shell and blown up. (Note: A French aviator flying above Combles reported that.... at 5:30 p.m. 26 September [25 September], 2,600 ft (800 m) above Combles: A great calm falls on the battlefield. The bluecoats have established themselves between Rancourt and Frégicourt, while more to the north, between Bouleaux Wood and Lesbœufs, a great line of khaki, harder to see, threatens the village of Morval. Large shells here and there tear up the ground. Looking from here one would say that after the hard struggles of the day the men had reached the limit of their endurance. The fight is without doubt finished for the day. Here and there an exhausted soldier is waiting for darkness to build up a small heap of earth to protect himself. But suddenly, just before 6:00 p.m. the British artillery opens a tornado of fire on the German lines. The enemy, unable to discover the threatened point for this new attack, places a barrage at random behind the British lines. Viewing the battlefield from my lofty point of vantage, it is possible for me to see at which point in the bombarded line the English artillery wish to clear a way for their infantry. It is at Morval; for it is there that the fire of lighter shells is more intense—it is there that the heavier shells are levelling the obstacles—it is there, too, over Morval, that the B.E.'s (the eyes of the Army) are circling. The rain of shells has continued for half an hour, when suddenly, without anything to warn the enemy of a change in the situation, the khaki line swarms forward as one man. Just as it reaches the curtain of fire, the latter, as if actuated by a single mind, moves forward in bounds, clears the village, and establishes itself some hundred yards beyond it, forming a barrier under cover of which the assaulting wave gains the mastery of the village and its outskirts. A few German signals of distress, a few bursting grenades around the dug-outs, an attempt at defence rapidly overwhelmed, and the khaki line, having gained almost a kilometre of ground, reforms beyond the objective. 'Morval is ours! Combles will be ours tonight!' — French pilot)

=== 26 September ===
The French 110th Infantry Regiment entered Combles from the south and by dawn had fought through the south-east part of the village and taken 200 prisoners. The 73rd Infantry Regiment attacked from the south-west and met groups of British infantry. German infantry retreating between the village and Frégicourt were routed and engaged by machine-gun fire as they fled to Haïe Wood. At 2:10 a.m. red rockets followed by one green rocket had been seen rising from the German positions west and north-west of the village, which was taken to be a signal for the German retirement and by 3:00 a.m. the 1/1st London patrols had reached the Orchard unopposed. One party pushed on into the village and linked with French troops. In the 169th Brigade area to the south, the London Rifle Brigade had advanced down Combles Trench and met French troops south of Morval near the sunken road and the 167th Brigade linked with the 5th Division south of Morval. The 1/1st London had advanced along the Ginchy road and took prisoners from Reserve Infantry regiments 234 and 235; at 7:00 a.m. the London Scottish had made contact with French patrols at the light railway near the north-east exit of the village. A document showed that the headquarters of I Battalion, Reserve Infantry Regiment 234 had left the village at 10:00 p.m. the night previous and some German troops retreating northwards towards Morval had been seen and shot down by the London Scottish. The 56th (1/1st London) Division troops digging-in about 1,500 yd (1,400 m) beyond Combles and Morval linked with the French who had captured Frégicourt just before dawn and advanced north.

A French attack on the German defences from Haïe Wood to St Pierre Vaast Wood was planned for the afternoon and the 168th Brigade was ordered to attack down the German third position (Mutton Trench) between Frégicourt and Morval. Reconnaissance by aircraft discovered that German troops occupied the trench and the 1/12th London (The Rangers) of the 168th Brigade was ordered to advance behind two tanks. Both tanks ditched on the approach and the attack was postponed and eventually cancelled. The French attack began at 4:00 p.m. and managed to advance on the flanks but was stopped in the centre by German machine-gun fire. The 5th Division advanced a short distance down Mutton Trench and took part of thunder Trench 800 yd (730 m) east of Morval and was then held up by German machine-gun fire from Sailly-Saillisel. During the afternoon the French Sixth Army and British Fourth Army staffs met to arrange a northward adjustment of the inter-army boundary, to the edge of Lesbœufs eastwards to the south of Le Transloy on the Péronne–Bapaume road. Behind the front line the new boundary was set through Guillemont and the Guillemont–Maricourt road.

== Aftermath ==
=== Analysis ===
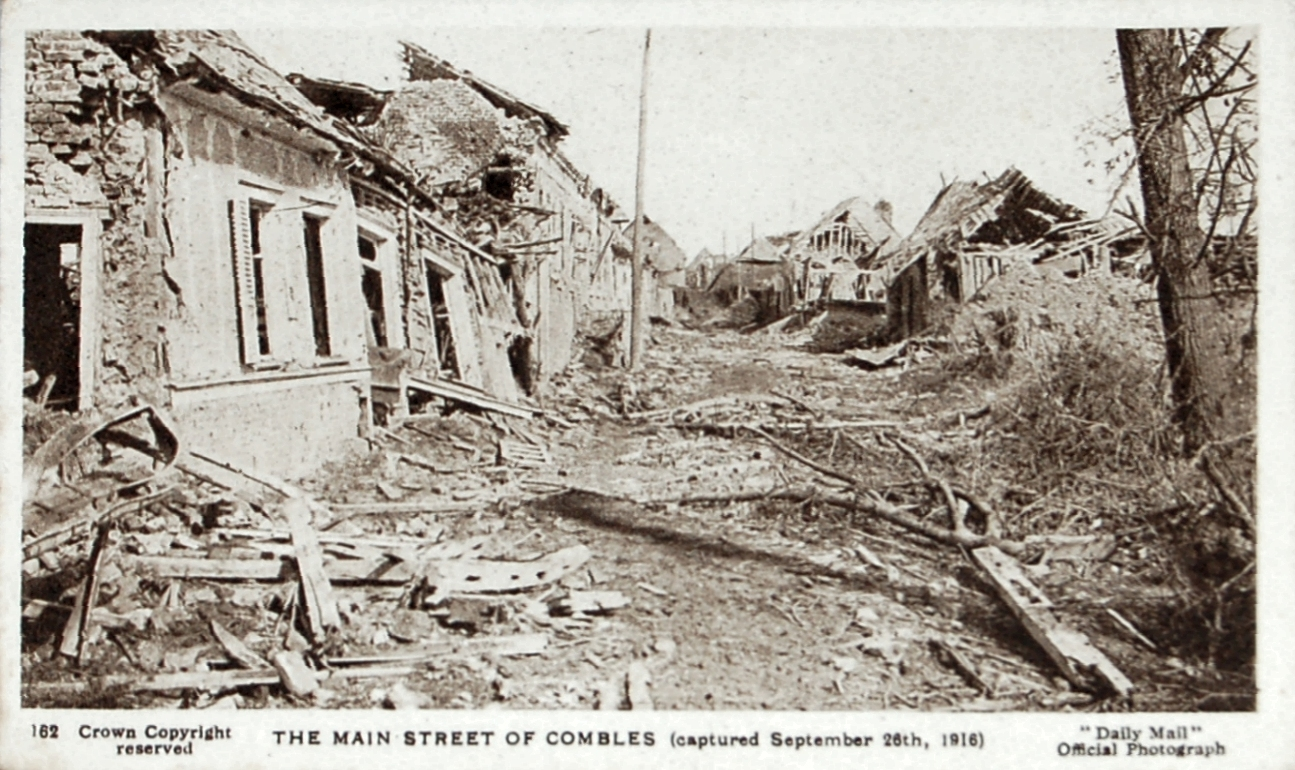
Main street of Combles after its capture in 1916

German reinforcements had arrived on the Somme front during September and conducted the big counter-attacks on both sides of the Somme from 20 to 23 September, to regain the ground lost since 12 September. The attacks were costly failures and Ludendorff called the fighting of 25 to 28 September the biggest engagement of the battle. Much German equipment was captured in Combles, including 1,500 rifles, two million rounds of ammunition, 15,000 shells and many hand-grenades. The battle of Morval had been a considerable Anglo-French victory. The objective was one German trench system, the original third line, which was less well-developed than the German defences on 15 September and was subjected to 40 per cent greater weight of shellfire. Rainfall from 16 to 22 September and the tempo of attacks had made it difficult for the Germans to improve their defences before the attack. French attacks in the south beyond Combles had less success, being confronted by a much larger amount of shell-fire. The 5th Division was relieved on the night of 26 September by the 20th (Light) Division, which was replaced by French troops after twenty-four hours, during the army boundary changes.

=== Casualties ===
The 5th Division suffered 1,749 casualties from 19 to 26 September and the 56th (1/1st London) Division suffered 5,538 casualties in September. New Zealand Division suffered 7,000 casualties from 15 September to 1 October. The German 1st and 2nd armies suffered c. 135,000 casualties in September, which was their most costly month of the battle. Post war commentary in the German Official History and by Crown Prince Rupprecht, dwelt on the loss of so many of the German army's remaining peace-trained officers, non-commissioned officers and infantry, particularly by an increased willingness to surrender.

=== Subsequent operations ===
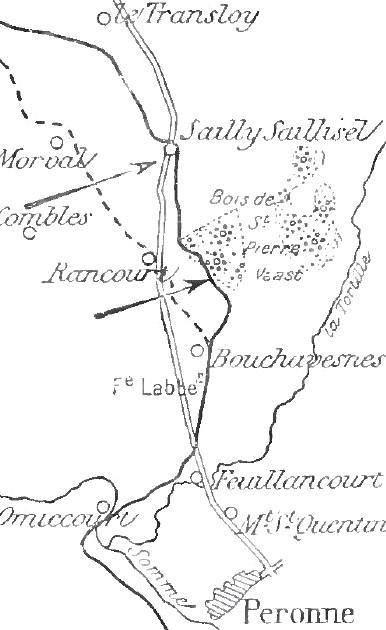
French attacks after the capture of Combles, September–October 1916

During the evening of 26 September, the 1/4th London was relieved in Bouleaux Wood by the 1/13th London (The Kensingtons) and withdrew to Bully and Beef trenches. During 27 September, trenches held by the 1/4th London was bombarded but there was no German counter-attack. In the evening the 168th Brigade handed over to the French 2nd Division and the 1/4th London, without relief in Bully and Beef trenches, withdrew to Casement Trench. The casualties of the 1/4th London were about 32 and rest of the 56th (1/1st London) Division was relieved by the 20th and 6th divisions, as the inter-army boundary was moved north during 27 September. I Corps advanced a short distance against the 213th Division, east of the Frégicourt–Le Transloy road. A new attack from 27 to 28 September, towards the German defences between Haïe Wood and St Pierre Vaast Wood, was delayed. Mutton Trench on the left flank was attacked at 4:00 p.m. by the British; the French attack managed to advance on the flanks but was held up in the centre around Sailly.

==== 1918 ====
Combles was recaptured by German troops on 24 March 1918, during the retreat of the 9th Division during Operation Michael, the German spring offensive. The village was recaptured for the last time on 29 August by the 18th Division, during the Second Battle of Bapaume.

=== Commemoration ===
Combles Communal Cemetery was begun by French troops in 1916, on the north-east side of the village and lies between the Frégicourt and Le Transloy roads. An Extension to the north-east was built for interments from the Frégicourt Communal Cemetery, Leuze Wood Cemetery, Longtree Dump Military Cemetery and Maurepas Military Cemetery, which were moved after the war.
