= Battle of Bagdad =

1866 battle in Mexico

- Part of the Second French intervention in Mexico
Date	4 January 1866
Location	Bagdad, Mexico
Result	Mexican Republican victory

Belligerents
Mexican rebels; United States	Mexican Empire; French Empire

Commanders and leaders
Mariano Escobedo	Tomás Mejía; Pierre Jeanningros; Georges Cloué; François Bazaine

The Battle of Bagdad took place on 4 January 1866, in the town of Bagdad in Matamoros, Tamaulipas, Mexico, between the Mexican army of the Republic against the army of the Second French and Mexican Empire.

== Background ==
With the outbreak of the American Civil War in 1861, Napoleon III deemed it an opportune moment to establish a Latin-American Catholic satellite as a bulwark against the United States' growing influence over the Americas. The ideal pretext for a French invasion of Mexico presented itself as Mexican president Benito Juárez suspended repayment of debt originating from British, French, and Spanish loans issued during the Mexican War of Reform. On December 6, 1861, Napoleon III launched a French military expedition into Mexico which devolved into an all-out war, the second French intervention in Mexico.

For a brief stretch of time in the mid-to-late 19th century, the Mexican port of Bagdad served as a strategic center of trade and commerce, comprising an invaluable link between Mexico and the Confederate States of America while controlling river access to the twin cities of Matamoros, Tamaulipas and Brownsville, Texas. As the French intervention in Mexico progressed, Bagdad was the principal conduit for Confederate aid to Mexican Republicans. Accordingly, France decided to seize the port, entrusting conservative colonel Tomás Mejía to undertake the operation in 1864 with the help of 2000 men and the French Navy. Mejía easily occupied an undefended Bagdad that same year.

Following his seizure of Bagdad, Mejía's forces endured constant harassment from the troops of Republican general Miguel Negrete. However, upon learning of the arrival of 500 Mexican soldiers' and 140 French artillerymen worth to reinforce Bagdad, General Negrete decided to withdraw until he received adequate reinforcements and supplies of his own

In 1865, increasing tensions with the US placed further pressure upon the French and Mejia to relinquish control of Bagdad. Following the expulsion of a contingent of Confederate soldiers from Brownsville to Matamoros, the United States sent 40,000 men to the border, pressuring the French to make a move. The French ordered the disembarkation of a vessel, the Tisiphone, from Bagdad to ease military tension in the face of constant threats from both the United States and Mexico.

On September 28, 1865, General Mariano Escobedo marched towards Bagdad with an 11-gun artillery detachment in tow, determined to expel the occupying forces. In response, French admiral Georges-Charles Cloué reinforced the city with four more navy vessels, the Adonis, Magellan, Tactique, and Tartare, effectively converting Bagdad to a war fortress. This development forced Escobedo to withdraw, whereupon Admiral Cloué sent a complaint to the American forces stationed in Brownsville on the grounds that their mobilization threatened to incite a war between the United States and the French Empire and the Second Mexican Empire. The French naval vessel l'Antonia soon added to the defense of Baghdad.

In November 1865, Escobedo besieged the neighboring city of Matamoros, prompting the finest French ships and many soldiers in Bagdad to reinforce Matamoros. With the departure of the Antonia, Adonis, and Tartare, the defenses of Bagdad were stretched thin, rendering it easy prey for a Mexican Republican or American attack. In light of this, General François Achille Bazaine sent two reinforcement columns to Baghdad, led respectively by Colonel De Ornano and General Pierre Joseph Jeanningros, while also ordering the ship l'Allier to disembark 300 Austrian soldiers, 20 conservative Mexican soldiers and 60 French cavalry soldiers to Baghdad on November 20.

== Battle ==
All the elements were then gathered for the main battle that took place on January 4, 1866. Exploiting the weakened defenses of Bagdad, Escobedo orchestrated a surprise attack on the coastal city, commanding a standard Mexican Republican army while reinforced by black regiments from the United States Navy. In the ensuing scramble, the French-allied forces of Bagdad were pushed from the outer city limits to the docks of Bagdad. Realizing their imminent defeat, The French-allied troops boarded the vessels of le Magellan, le Tactique, and l´Allier, sailing away from the scene. The conclusion of the battle resulted in a decisive victory for the Mexican Republicans.

== Aftermath ==
1,000 American soldiers stayed after the battle to loot the city for 20 days.

American general Godfrey Weitzel sent 150 men to restore order in Bagdad that had been occupied by Mexican forces. After learning of this, there was a new protest by the French admiral Georges Cloué, who demanded the departure of the American forces on January 25. In June, a unit of 2,000 conservative forces left Monterrey to reinforce Matamoros. The first half of the unit paused due to illness. The 300 men of general Olvera of the unit's second half were attacked on June 15 in Camargo by 5,000 Mexicans and U.S. mercenaries. Only 150 men remained in Matamoros together with general Tomás Mejía. The French, being unable to sustain the constant attacks on the city, evacuated the 400 men who remained in Bagdad, leaving on the ship Adonis for the port of Veracruz.
