= St Pierre Vaast Wood =

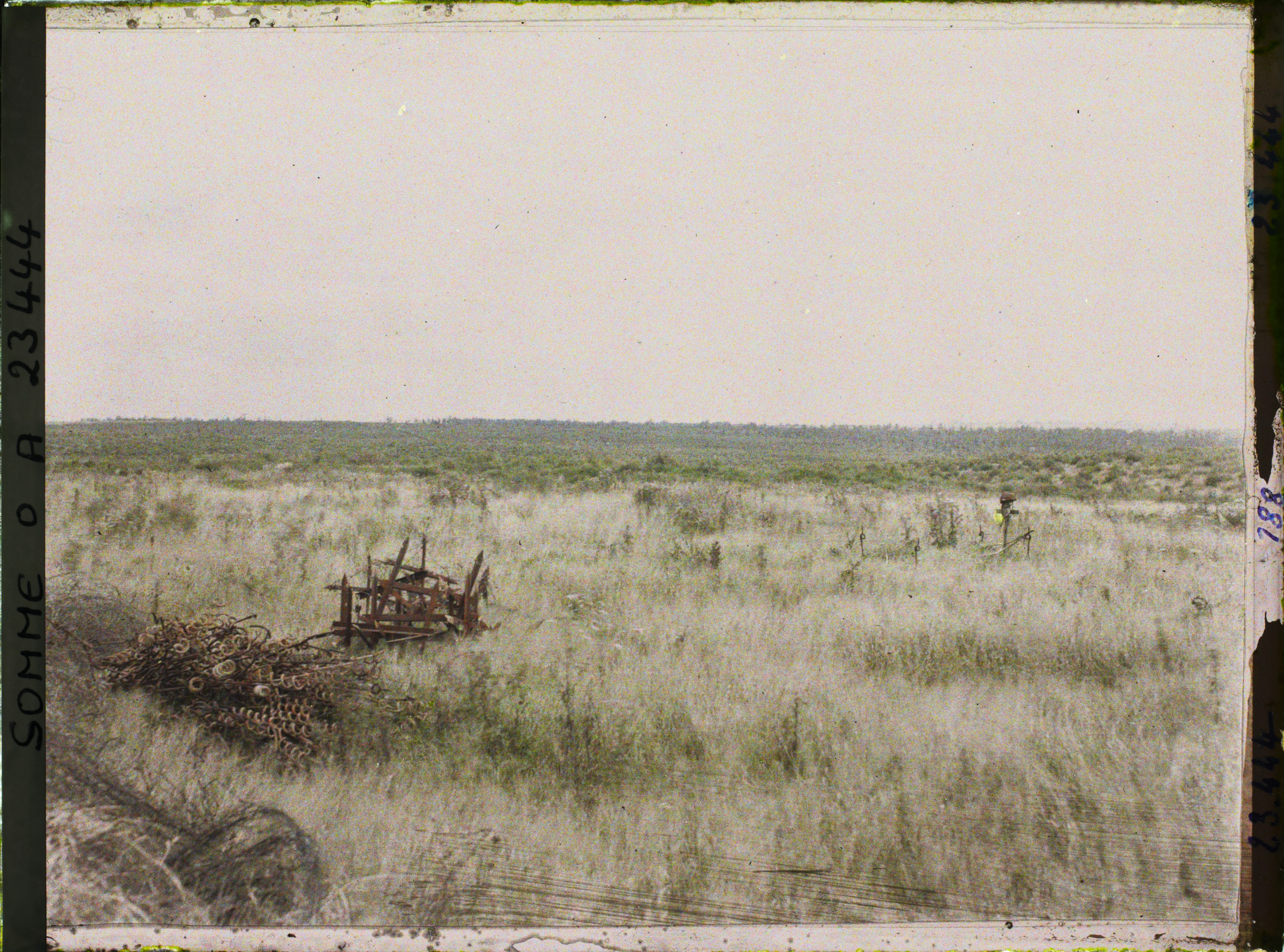
Picture taken of the woods in 1920

The St Pierre Vaast Wood is a woodland in the Somme department of northern France, which was a heavily fortified German position during the Battle of the Somme, where it was the site of repeated French attacks. The fighting around the wood is described by Ernst Jünger in a chapter of his memoir Storm of Steel, entitled The Woods of St-Pierre-Vaast. On 14 March 1917, German artillery began shelling its own front line on the western edge of St Pierre Vaast Wood, one of the earlier signs to British forces that the Germans were abandoning more forward positions for the more defensible Hindenburg Line.

== See also ==
- Battle of Flers–Courcelette
- Battle of Morval
- Battle of Le Transloy
- Operation Alberich
- Operations on the Ancre, January–March 1917
- Capture of Gueudecourt
- Capture of Lesbœufs
- Capture of Combles
