= Pierre Joseph Jeanningros =

Pierre Jean Joseph Jeanningros
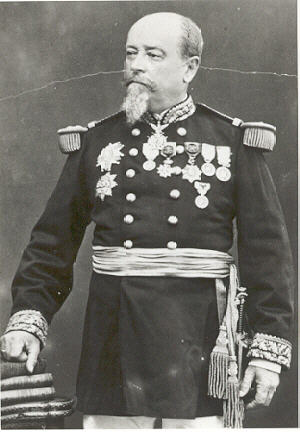
- Born: 21 November 1816; Besançon, France
- Died: 30 April 1902 (aged 85); Paris, France
- Military career
- Allegiance: France
- Branch: French Army; French Foreign Legion
- Service years: 1834 – 1881
- Rank: Général
- Commands: Foreign Regiment; R.E (1862); 1st Brigade of the 2nd Infantry Division; 2^{e} DI (1867) (French: 2^{e} Division d'Infanterie); 13th Infantry Division; 13^{e} DI (1873) (French: 13^{e} Division d'Infanterie); 8th Infantry Division; 8^{e} DI (1878) (French: 8e division d'infanterie)
- Conflicts: Crimean War; Italian Campaign; Second Franco-Mexican War; Franco-Prussian War
- Awards: Legion d'honneur (Grand Officier)
- Other work: Inspector general of the scholar battalions (1883)

Pierre Jean Joseph Jeanningros (21 November 1816 Besançon, France – 30 April 1902) was a French general, famous for having commanded the French Foreign Legion.

== Military career ==
On 20 November 1834 he became a soldier, as an enfant troop (French: enfant de troupe) at the 66th Line Infantry Regiment (French: 66^{e} Régiment d'Infanterie de Ligne), his Father's unit. He was promoted to Caporal (Corporal) on 6 July 1835, Fourrier (French: fourrier) (fourrier: non-commissioned officer responsible for stewardship) on 14 December 1836 and Grenadier Fourrier on 21 April 1836. On 1 December 1836 he was assigned as a Sergent (Sergeant) at the Zouaves (French: Zouaves) Regiment. He passed sergeant major (French: Sergent-Major) on 16 August 1837 and Sous-Lieutenant on 21 June 1840.

On 8 September 1841 he was assigned as a Sous-Lieutenant to the 2nd Zouaves Regiment (French: 2^{e} Régiment de Zouaves). He was accordingly promoted to lieutenant on 2 January 1842 and captain on 10 July 1847.

On 14 March 1852 he returned as captain to the 1st Zouaves Regiment (French: 1^{er} Régiment de Zouaves) and was designated as Capatain Adjudant Major on 3 May 1852.

On 7 February 1854 he was designated as a Chef de bataillon (commandant – major) in the 43rd Line Infantry Regiment (French: 43^{e} Régiment d'Infanterie de Ligne) and was assigned on 4 July 1855 to the 1st Guard Voltigeurs Regiment.

On 2 October 1855 he was promoted to lieutenant-colonel in the 82nd Line Infantry Regiment (French: 82^{e} Régiment d'Infanterie de Ligne) and passed colonel on 12 July 1859 at the 43rd Line Infantry Regiment (French: 43^{e} Régiment d'Infanterie de Ligne).

Under a Ministerial decision, he was assigned as a colonel in the Foreign Regiment in Mexico (French: Mexique) and became superior commander of Veracruz (French: Veracruz) and the Hot Lands from 14 June 1863 to 26 February 1864. From 20 June 1865 he was assigned to the command of the subdivision of Monterrey (French: Monterrey), including the States of Coahuila and Nuevo León (French: Léon).

On 1 August 1865 he was promoted to Général de brigade, commanding the 2nd Brigade of the 2nd Division of the same States. He retained simultaneously his position at the head of the Foreign Legion, until 31 May 1866. He was accordingly designated as superior commandant for the States of Querétaro (French: Querétaro) and Sierra.

He returned to France with the occupation army and disembarked at Saint-Nazaire on 28 March 1867. He was named by an Imperial decision on 30 March 1867 to the command of the 1st Brigade of the 2nd Infantry Division (French: 2^{e} Division d'Infanterie) of the Imperial Guard, consisting of:

- The Zouaves (French: Zouaves)
- The 1st Grenadier Regiment à Pied of the Imperial Guard (French: 1^{er} Régiment de Grenadiers à Pied de la Garde Imperial)
- The Regiment of Gendarmerie

On 23 October 1870 with the capitulation of the army at Metz he was made a prisoner of war and was interned in Germany at Aachen (French: Aix-la-Chapelle). He returned to France on 12 March 1871 where he was of disposition and availability.

On 11 June 1871 he was nominated to the command of the subdivision of Indre-et-Loire, at Tours.

On 17 August 1871 he was nominated to the command of the 2nd Brigade of the 1st Division of the 4th Corps of the Army of Versailles (French: Armée de Versailles), by Ministerial decision.

By decree on 22 May 1873 he was promoted to Général de division and placed at the position of disposition, starting 1 June. On 18 October 1873 he was nominated to the command of the 13th Infantry Division (French: 13^{e} Division d'Infanterie), which was part of the 1st Army Corps (French: 1^{er} Corps d'Armée), commanded by The Duke (French: général Duc d'Aumale).

On 16 June 1874 he became inspector general of the 13th Infantry Arrondissement and added progressively to this active command, the subdivisions of the regions of Bourg, Belley, and Langres. From 30 June 1876 to 2 July 1877 he was the inspector general of the 13th Infantry Arrondissement.

On 22 January 1878 he was designated as the commandant of the 8th Infantry Division (French: 8e division d'infanterie), at the 4th Army Corps (French: 4^{e} Corps d'Armée). From 27 May 1878 to 12 May 1881 he was inspector general of the 8th Infantry Arrondissement. In October 1881 he joined to his command the divisions of Mayenne, Laval, Mayenne, Le Mans, Alençon and Argentan.

As of 21 November 1881 he was admitted by Presidential decision to the reserve section. On 23 November, on his demand, he was admitted to valorize his rights for retirement pension. He was officially retired by decree on 17 January 1882 after 48 years of service.

In 1883 he was designated as inspector general of the scholar battalion (French: bataillons scolaires). This patriotic movement regrouped institution members, interested in implementing basic physical culture and discipline to the young French people.

In 1889, he retired from all works.

== Recognitions and Honors ==
His bravery during combats of the conquest of Algeria nicknamed him as "le Bayard des braves"

Wounded 6 times under fires, he totalized 4 citations.

- 1843, Knight of the Order of the Légion d'honneur.
- 1856, Officer of the Order of the Légion d'honneur.
- 1856, 4th Class of the Ottoman Order of the Medjidie
- 1863, Medal of His Majesty the King of Sardinia (Crimean Campaign).
- 1863, Commander of the Imperial Order of the Légion d'honneur.
- 1864, Commander of the Imperial Order of Our Lady of Guadalupe.
- 1866, Grand Officer of the Imperial Order of Our Lady of Guadalupe.
- 1877, Grand Officer of the Order of the Légion d'honneur.

He was also titular of the following decorations:

- Crimea Medal
- Commemorative medal of the 1859 Italian Campaign
- Commemorative medal of the Mexico Expedition
- Valor Medal of Sardinia

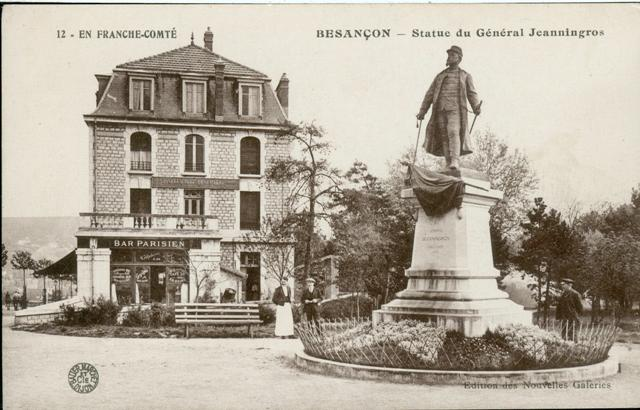
Général Jeanningros (statue destroyed in 1942).

Since 1986 a road in Servon bears his name.

A statue of the general was inaugurated on 15 August 1909 at Besançon, by the Minister of War at the époque, general Brun. In light of construction of a war memorial depicting the war of 1914/1918, the statue was moved. Fabricated in bronze, the occupation authorities ordered, in 1942, to melt it simultaneously along with that of Pierre Joseph Proudhon which was nearby.

== See also ==
- Patrice de MacMahon, Duke of Magenta
- François Certain Canrobert
- François Achille Bazaine
