= Les Authieux-sur-Calonne =

- Commune
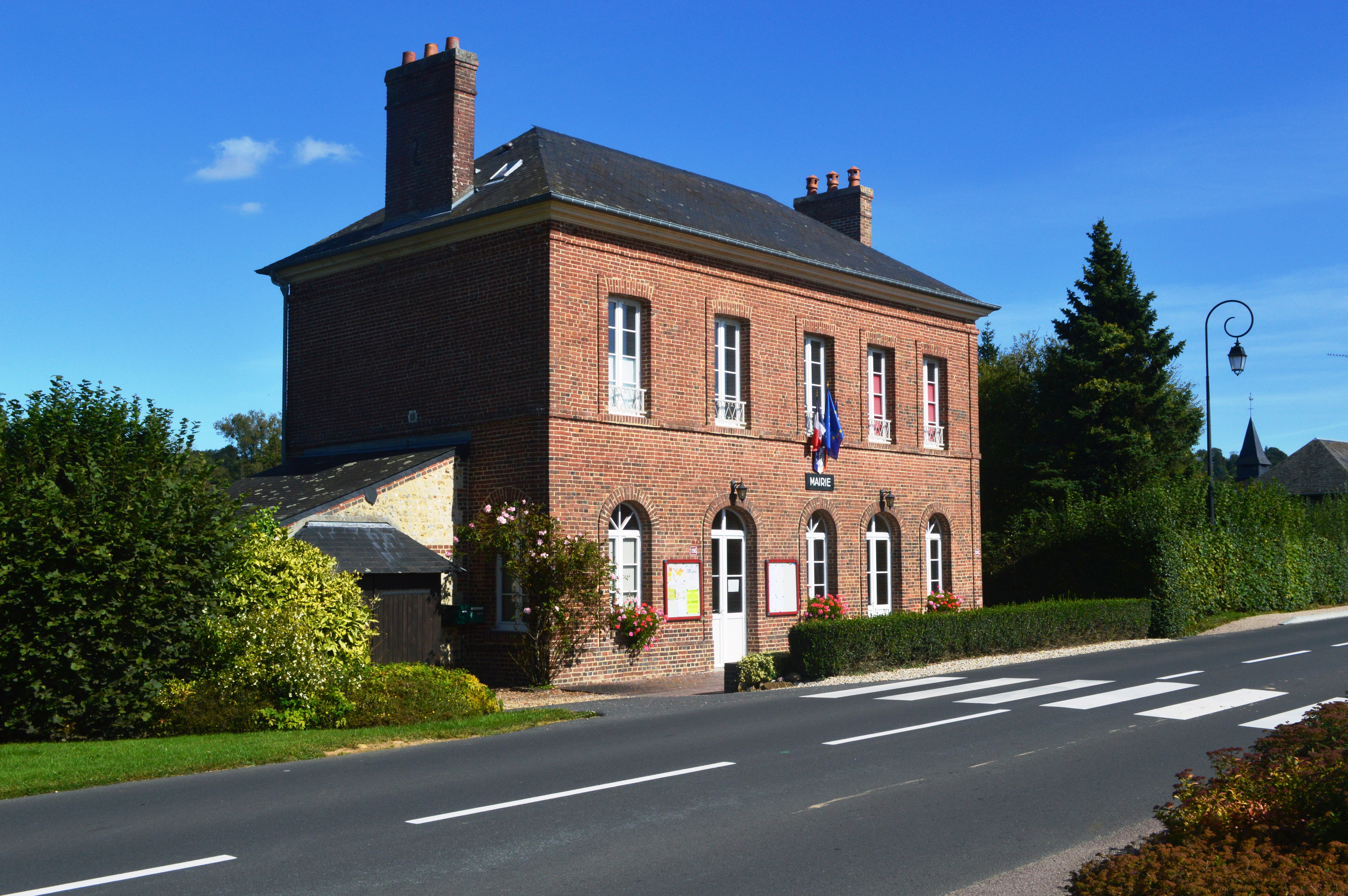
- The town hall in Les Authieux-sur-Calonne

- Coat of arms
- Location of Les Authieux-sur-Calonne
- Location within France Location within Normandy
- Coordinates: 49°17′53″N 0°17′04″E
- Country: France
- Region: Normandy
- Department: Calvados
- Arrondissement: Lisieux
- Canton: Pont-l'Évêque
- Intercommunality: CC Terre d'Auge

Government
  - Mayor (2022–2026): Christelle Fesquet
- Area^{1}: 10.2 km^{2} (3.9 sq mi)
- Elevation: 136 m (446 ft)
- Highest elevation: 162 m (531 ft)
- Lowest elevation: 23 m (75 ft)
- Population (2023): 278
  - Density: 27.3/km^{2} (70.6/sq mi)
- Time zone: UTC+01:00 (CET)
  - Summer (DST): UTC+02:00 (CEST)
- INSEE/Postal code: 14032 /14130
- ^{1} French Land Register data, which excludes lakes, ponds, glaciers > 1 km^{2} (0.386 sq mi or 247 acres) and river estuaries.

Les Authieux-sur-Calonne (French pronunciation: [le.z‿otjø syʁ kalɔn]) is a commune in the Calvados department in the Normandy region of north-western France.

== Geography ==
Les Authieux-sur-Calonne is located some 55 km north-east of Caen and 27 km south-east of Le Havre. Access to the commune is by the D534 road from Cormeilles in the south-east which passes through the north of the commune and the village and continues to join the D675 just west of the commune. The D140 road goes south from the village through the length of the commune to Le Mesnil-sur-Blangy in the south. Apart from the village there are the hamlets of La Route de Blangy, La Boudiniere, and La Grenterie. The commune is mostly farmland with some scattered forests.

The Calonne river forms the north-eastern border of the commune as it flows north-west then west to join the Touques at Pont-l'Évêque. Several tributaries rise in the commune and flow north to join the Calonne including the Douet de la Thibaudiere, the Ruisseau des Rebutieres, the Ruisseau du Val Plot, and the Ryisseau de Manoir.

=== Heraldry ===
Arms of Les Authieux-sur-Calonne	Blazon: Gules, two lions passant guardant of Or langued of Gules one over the other, in chief Azure charged with three churches of Argent..

== Administration ==
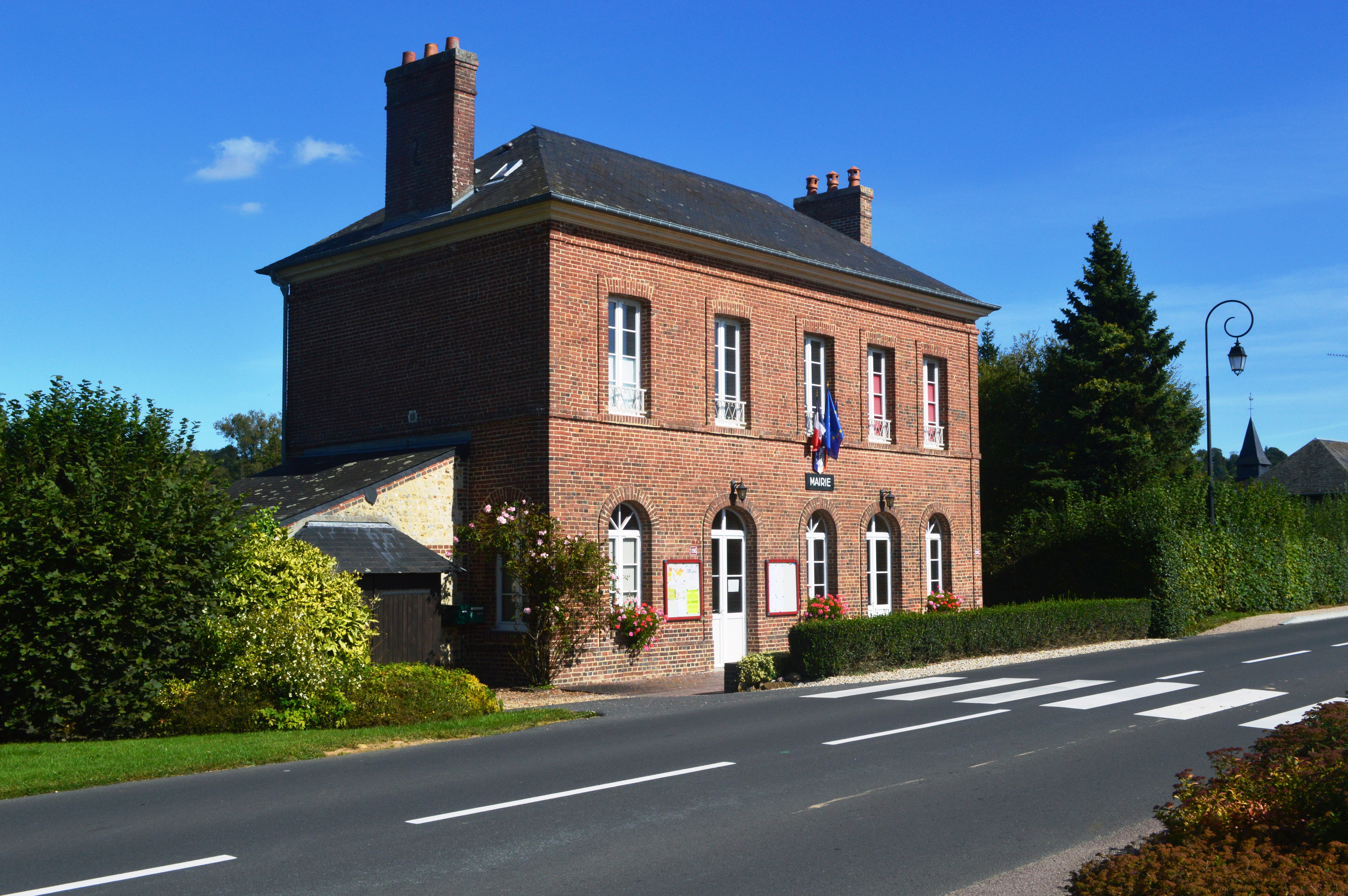
The Town Hall

List of Successive Mayors

From	To	Name	Party	Position
	2001	Monique Hachier		
2001	2008	Lionel Barle		CEO
2008	2020	Jean-Alain Charpentier		Shipping manager
2020	2026	Ludovic Legout		

== Demography ==
The inhabitants of the commune are known as Altaréens or Altaréennes in French.

Historical population

Year	Pop.	±% p.a.
1793	652	—
1821	634	−0.10%
1846	501	−0.94%
1872	411	−0.76%
1901	354	−0.51%
1926	375	+0.23%
1946	326	−0.70%
1962	230	−2.16%
1968	219	−0.81%

Year	Pop.	±% p.a.
1975	180	−2.76%
1982	186	+0.47%
1990	219	+2.06%
1999	250	+1.48%
2007	306	+2.56%
2012	291	−1.00%
2017	286	−0.35%
2023	278	−0.47%

Source: EHESS and INSEE

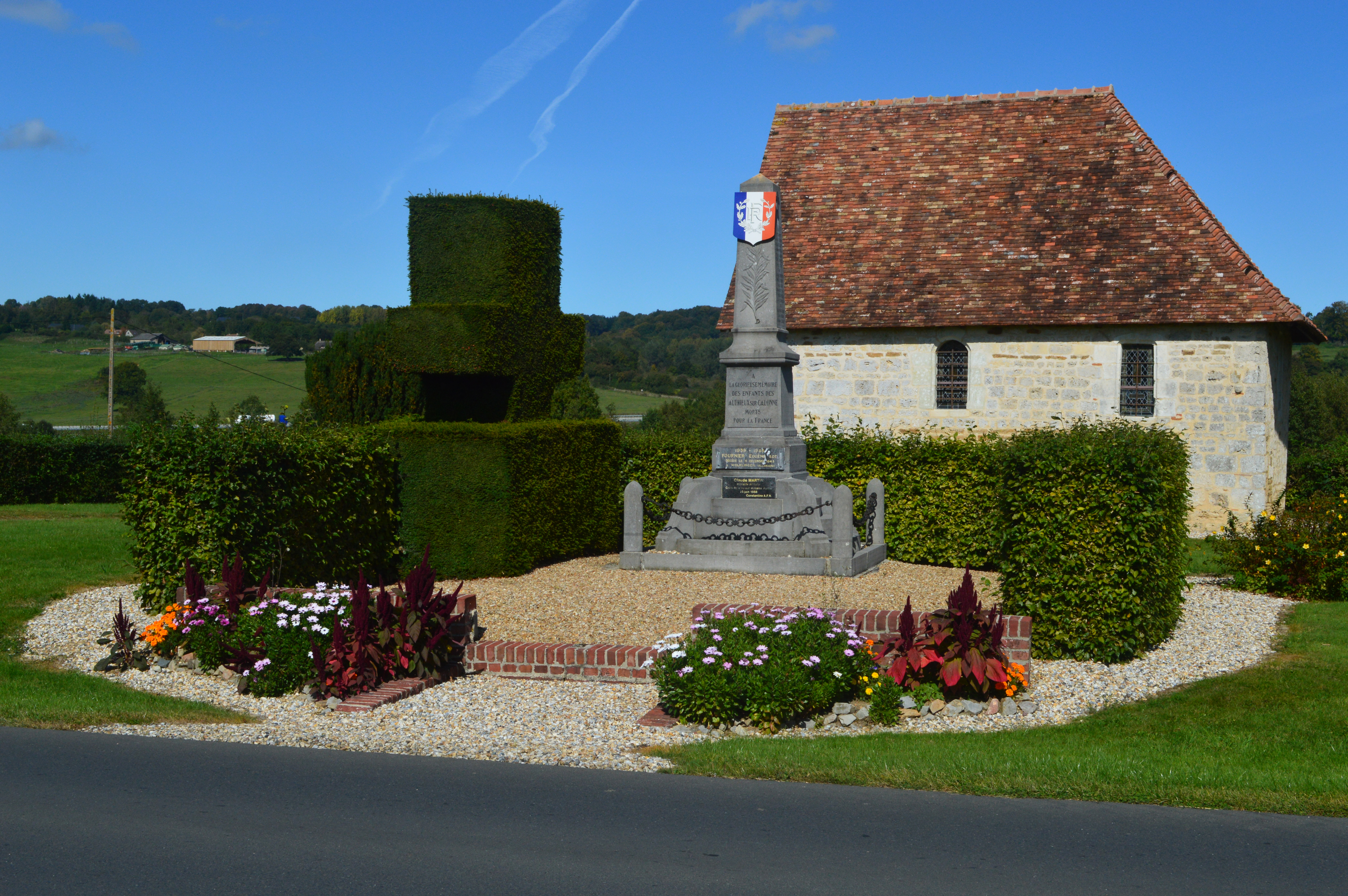
Les Authieux-sur-Calonne War Memorial

== Culture and heritage ==
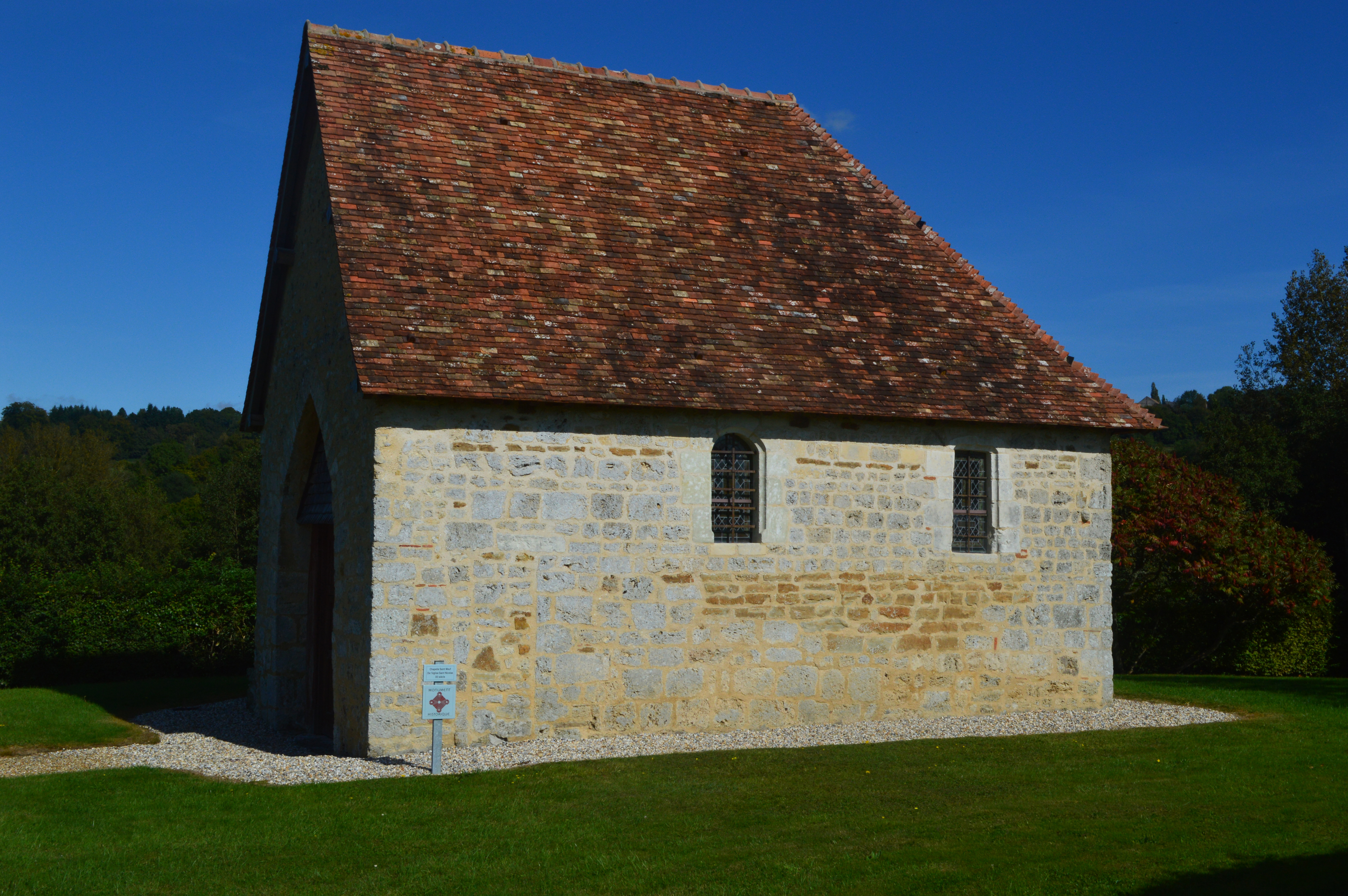
The Chapel of Saint Meuf

=== Civil heritage ===
The commune has two buildings and structures that are registered as historical monuments:

- The Manoir de la Porte (18th century)
- The Tanning and Wheat Mill (1853)

=== Religious heritage ===
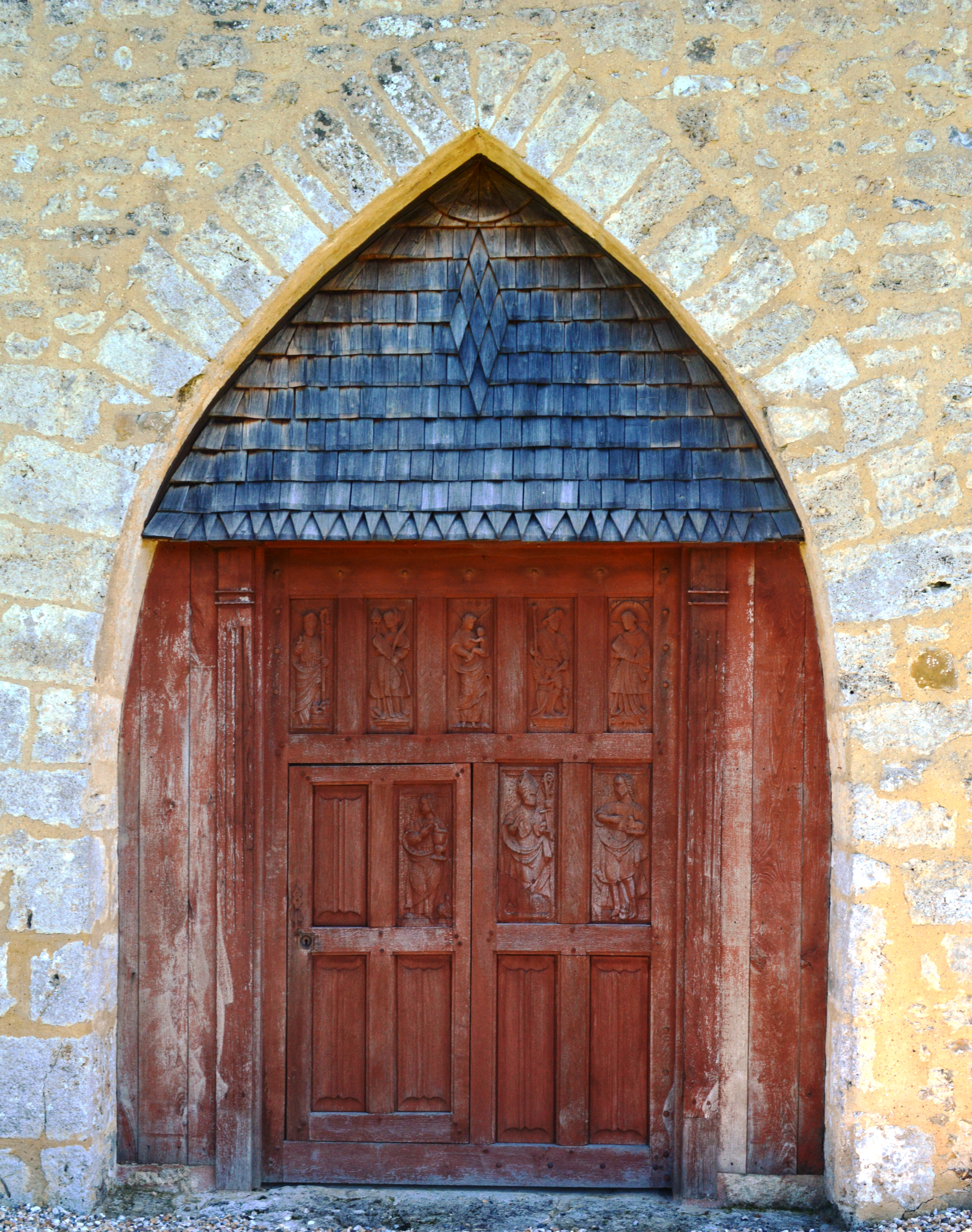
The Saint Meuf Chapel Portal

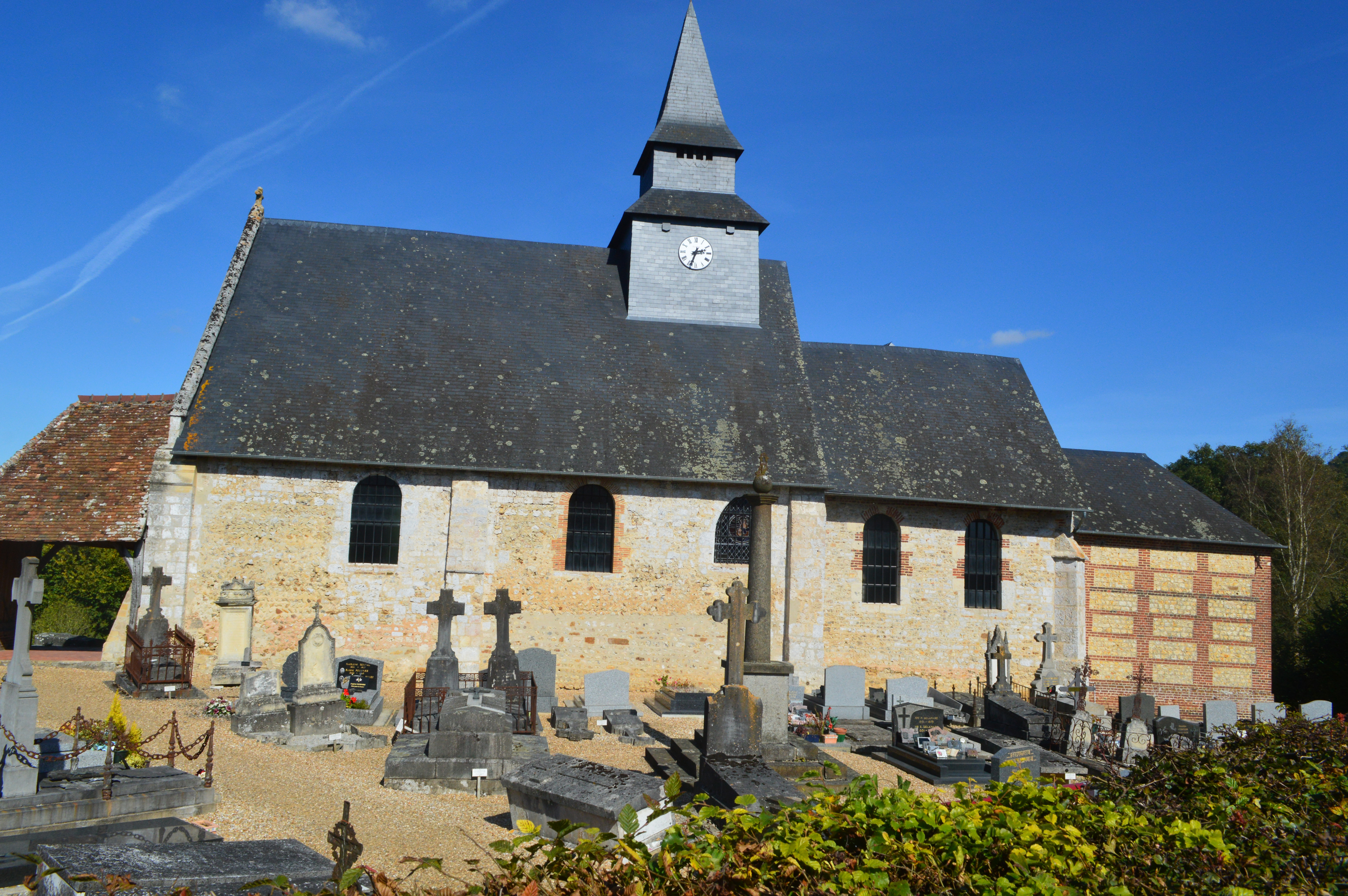
The Church of Saint Pierre

The commune has one religious building that is registered as an historical monument:

- The Chapel Saint-Meuf The Chapel contains one item that is registered as an historical object:
  - The Portal (16th century)

The Parish Church of Saint-Pierre contains many items that are registered as historical objects:

- 5 Statues (17th century)
- A Tabernacle, 2 seating sets, Tabernacle housing (17th century)
- A Painting: the Assumption (17th century)
- A Retable (17th century)
- The Altar facing (17th century)
- The main Altar (17th century)
- The main Altar (17th century)
- The Altar facing (17th century)
- A Statue: Saint Nicolas (16th century)
- A Stoup and portable Stoup (15th century)

== Notable people linked to the commune ==
- Henry Victor Deligny (1855-1938 at Authieux-sur-Calonne), General of Division in the First World War.

== See also ==
- Communes of the Calvados department
