= Henry Victor Deligny =

French divisional general

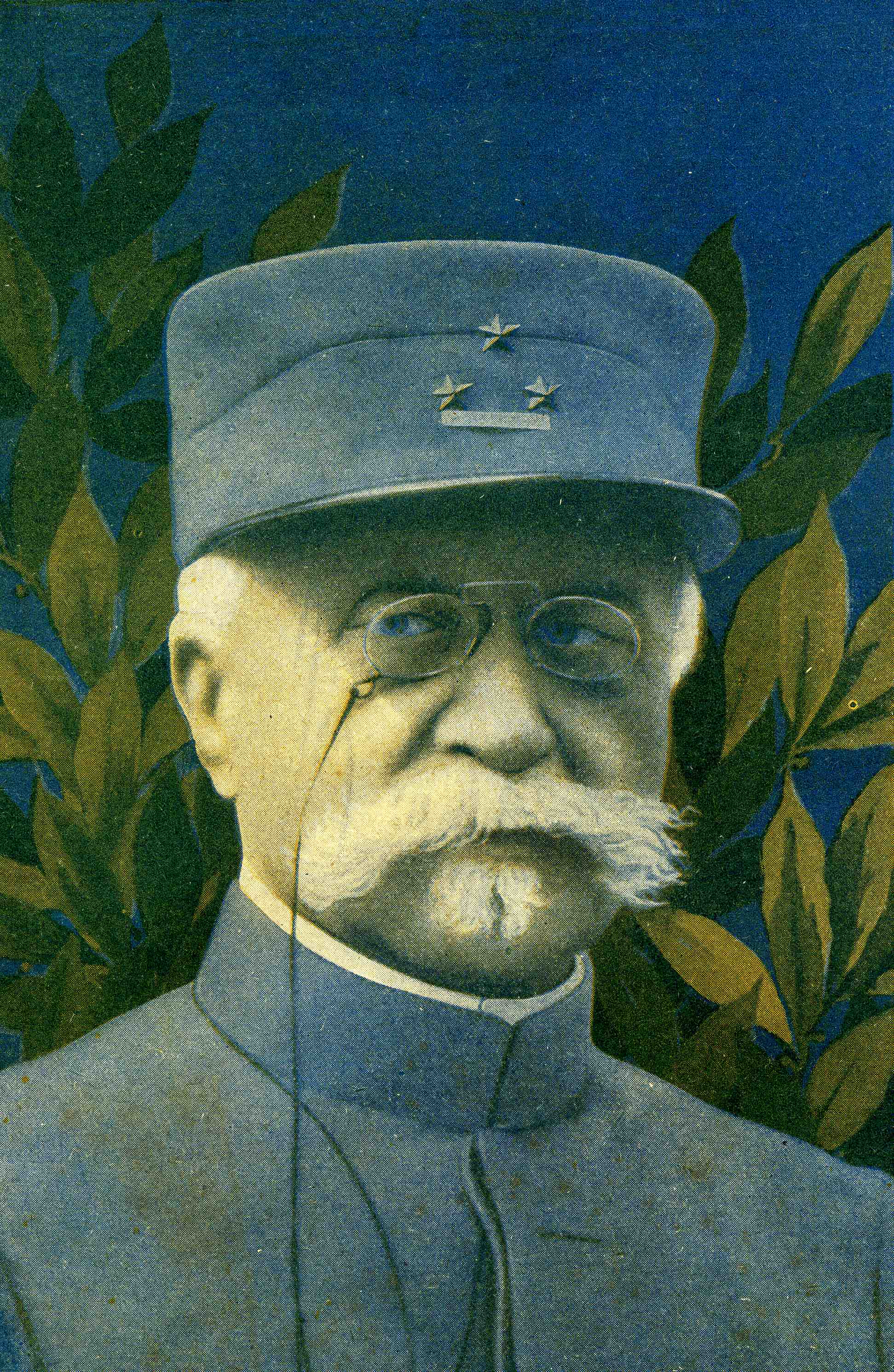
- Born: 5 September 1855; Rennes, France
- Died: 2 January 1938 (aged 82) Les Authieux-sur-Calonne, France
- Allegiance: France
- Branch: French Army
- Rank: Divisional General
- Commands: 2nd Infantry Division; 1st Army Corps
- Awards: Grand-Croix du Legion d'Honneur Croix de Guerre 1914-1918 Army Distinguished Service Medal

Commander of the 39th Army Corps
- In office 26 March 1916 – 1 December 1917
- President: Raymond Poincaré
- Minister of War: Pierre Roques; Hubert Lyautey; Lucien Lacaze (as interim); Paul Painlevé; Georges Clemenceau
- Chief of Staff: Joseph Joffre; Robert Nivelle; Philippe Pétain; Ferdinand Foch
- Preceded by: Militaty unit created
- Succeeded by: Military unit dissolved

Commander of the 153rd Infantry Division
- In office 29 March 1915 – 26 March 1916
- President: Raymond Poincaré
- Minister of War: Alexandre Millerand; Joseph Gallieni; Pierre Roques
- Chief of Staff: Joseph Joffre
- Preceded by: Military unit created
- Succeeded by: General Magnan

Commander of the 1st Army Corps
- In office 3 September 1914 – 25 February 1915
- President: Raymond Poincaré
- Minister of War: Alexandre Millerand
- Chief of Staff: Joseph Joffre
- Preceded by: Louis Franchet d'Espèrey
- Succeeded by: Adolphe Guillaumat

Commander of the 2nd Infantry Division
- In office 2 August – 8 September 1914
- President: Raymond Poincaré
- Minister of War: Adolphe Messimy; Alexandre Millerand
- Chief of Staff: Joseph Joffre
- Preceded by: Charles Ferdinand Bizart
- Succeeded by: Noël Garnier-Duplessix

Henry Victor Deligny (5 September 1855 – 2 January 1938) was a French divisional general who served in the First World War.

== Biography ==
Deligny was born in Rennes in 1855, the son of Victor Valéry Deligny, a house painter, and Anne Émilie Gilles. He entered the Ecole Spéciale Militaire de Saint-Cyr on 27 October 1873.

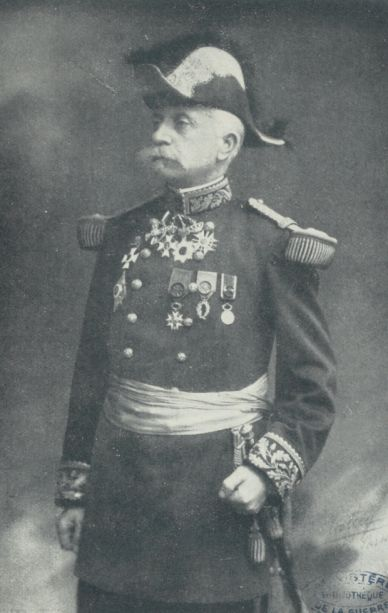
Deligny during the Great War.

Made a Lieutenant Colonel on 12 July 1903, he was second in command for the General Staff of the Second Army Corps. He became a Colonel on 23 June 1907, and was named Deputy Director of Studies at the École Supérieure de Guerre. On 23 March 1911, he was promoted to Brigadier General and put in charge of infantry operations for the Minister of War.

When the First World War broke out, he was promoted to Divisional General, and commanded the Second Infantry Division from 2 August 1914 until 8 September 1914. On 27 October 1914 he was put in charge of the 1st Army Corps at the First Battle of the Marne.

Injured three times, given two commendations, and specially remarked upon for his role in the Second Battle of the Aisne, Deligny received the Plaque de Grand Officier of the Legion of Honour on 30 November 1917.

From 18 December 1917 until 10 March 1919, he commanded the 3rd Military Region from Rouen.

== Works ==
- Instruction pratique sur les exercices de combat des troupes d'infanterie, par le commandant Deligny, H. Charles-Lavauzelle, 1898, 79 p.

== Bibliography ==
- « Le général Deligny », in Le Pays de France, no174, 14 février 1918, p. 3
- Bathélemy Edmond Palat, La grande guerre sur le front occidental, Chapelot, Paris, 1925
- Les armées françaises dans la grande guerre, Imprimerie nationale, 1927
