= Ville-aux-Bois =

Commune in Grand Est, France

- Commune
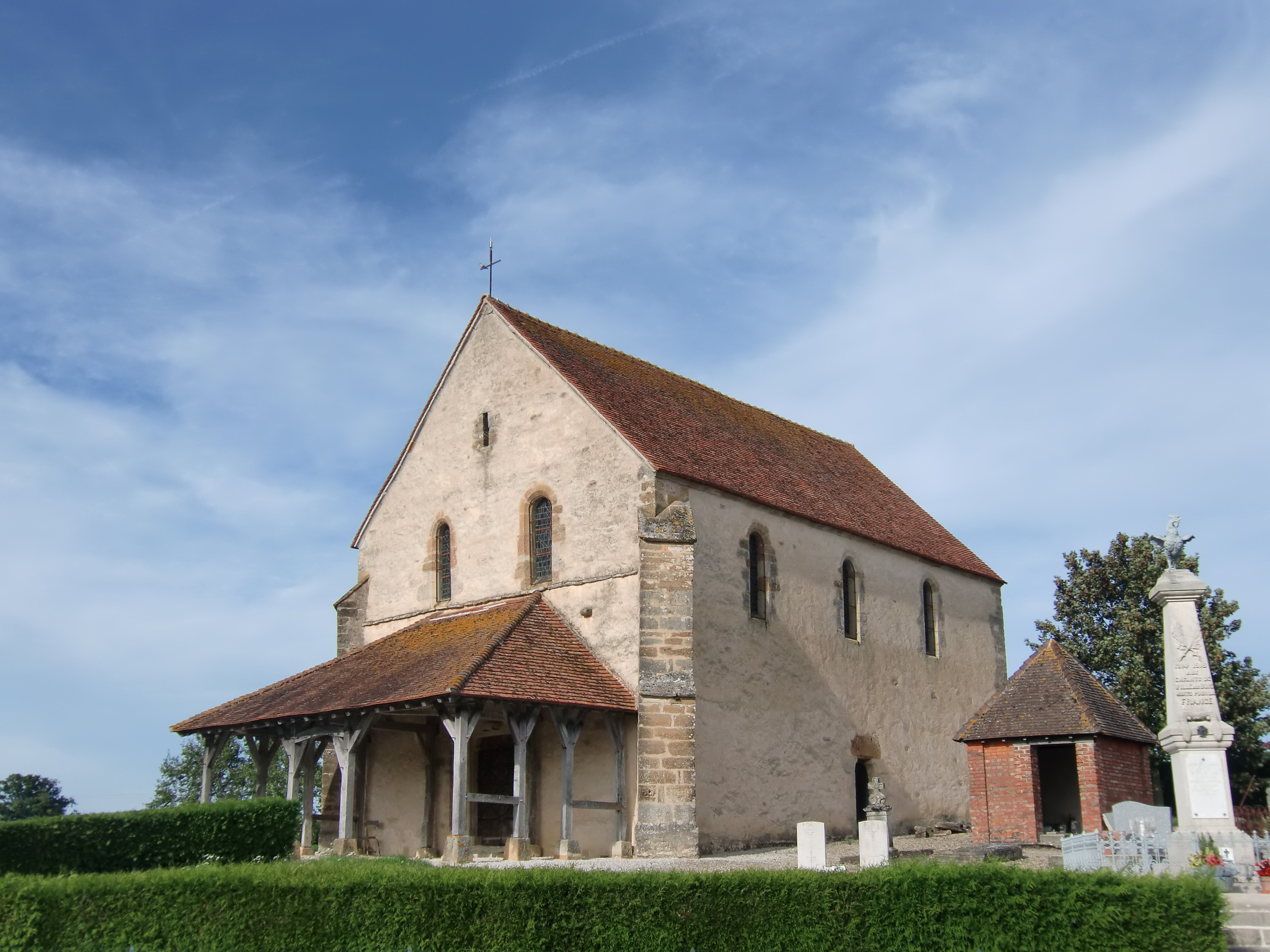
- The church in Ville-aux-Bois
- Location of Ville-aux-Bois
- Location within France Location within Grand Est
- Coordinates: 48°24′27″N 4°41′28″E
- Country: France
- Region: Grand Est
- Department: Aube
- Arrondissement: Bar-sur-Aube
- Canton: Bar-sur-Aube

Government
  - Mayor (2020–2026): Christian Collinet
- Area^{1}: 5.56 km^{2} (2.15 sq mi)
- Elevation: 139 m (456 ft)
- Population (2023): 28
  - Density: 5.0/km^{2} (13/sq mi)
- Time zone: UTC+01:00 (CET)
  - Summer (DST): UTC+02:00 (CEST)
- INSEE/Postal code: 10411 /10500
- ^{1} French Land Register data, which excludes lakes, ponds, glaciers > 1 km^{2} (0.386 sq mi or 247 acres) and river estuaries.

Ville-aux-Bois (before 2025: La Ville-aux-Bois, French pronunciation: [la vil o bwa]) is a commune in the Aube department in north-central France.

== Population ==
Historical population
Year	Pop.	±% p.a.
1968	12	—
1975	11	−1.24%
1982	14	+3.51%
1990	18	+3.19%
1999	12	−4.41%
2007	20	+6.59%
2012	20	+0.00%
2017	30	+8.45%
2023	28	−1.14%
Source: INSEE

== See also ==
- Communes of the Aube department
