= Esternay =

- Commune
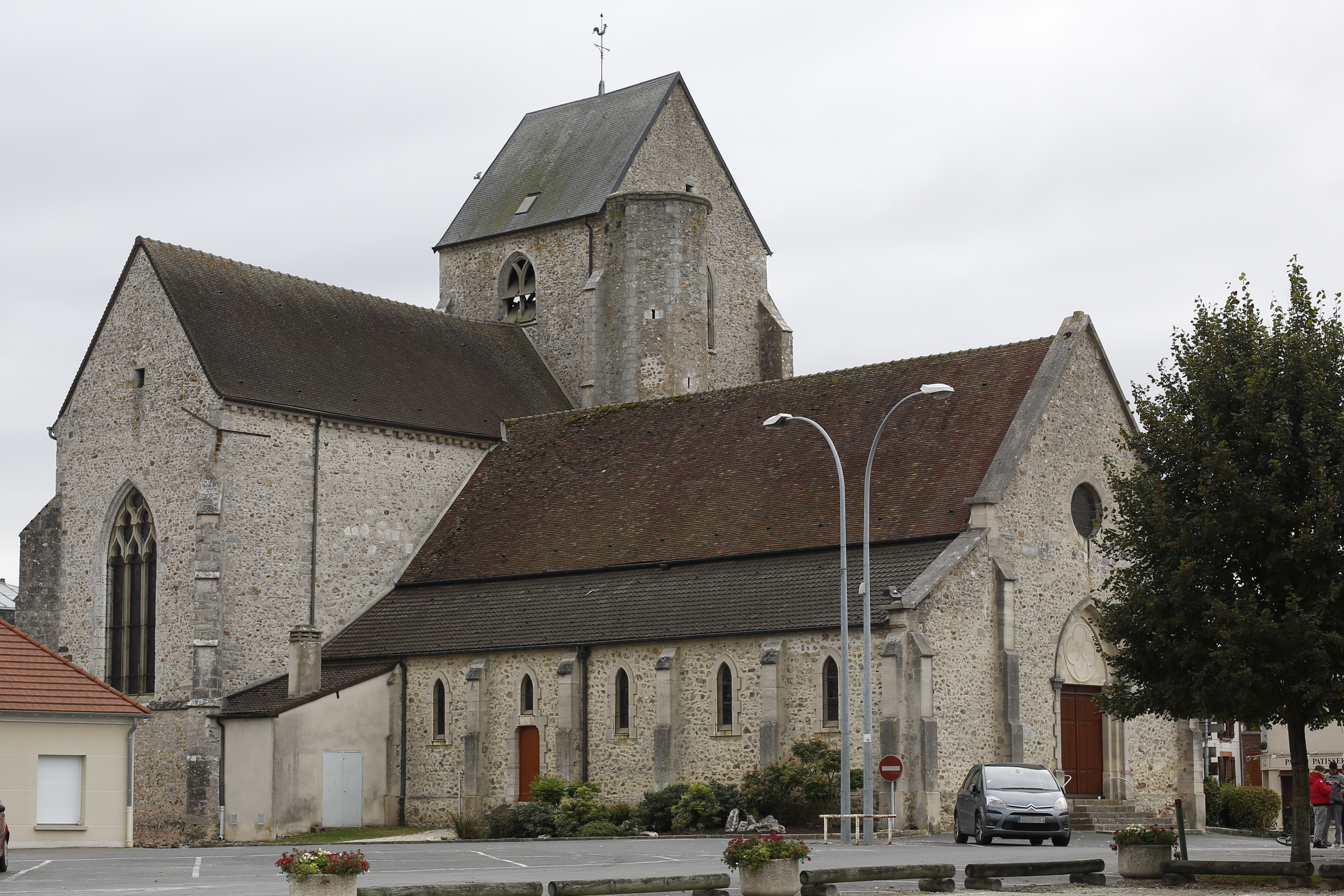
- The church in Esternay
- Location of Esternay
- Location within France Location within Grand Est
- Coordinates: 48°43′58″N 3°33′37″E
- Country: France
- Region: Grand Est
- Department: Marne
- Arrondissement: Épernay
- Canton: Sézanne-Brie et Champagne
- Intercommunality: Sézanne-Sud Ouest Marnais

Government
  - Mayor (2020–2026): Patrice Valentin
- Area^{1}: 31.98 km^{2} (12.35 sq mi)
- Elevation: 158 m (518 ft)
- Population (2023): 1,748
  - Density: 54.66/km^{2} (141.6/sq mi)
- Time zone: UTC+01:00 (CET)
  - Summer (DST): UTC+02:00 (CEST)
- INSEE/Postal code: 51237 /51310
- ^{1} French Land Register data, which excludes lakes, ponds, glaciers > 1 km^{2} (0.386 sq mi or 247 acres) and river estuaries.

Esternay (French pronunciation: [ɛstɛʁnɛ]) is a commune in the Marne department in north-eastern France. Its sister city is Chatham, New Jersey, with which it also shares an exchange student program.

== Climate ==
On average, Esternay experiences 53.2 days per year with a minimum temperature below 0 °C (32.0 °F), one day per year with a minimum temperature below −10 °C (14.0 °F), 6.4 days per year with a maximum temperature below 0 °C (32.0 °F), and 12.4 days per year with a maximum temperature above 30 °C (86.0 °F). The record high temperature was 41.4 °C (106.5 °F) on July 25, 2019, while the record low temperature was −16.0 °C (3.2 °F) on February 22, 1996.

Climate data for Esternay (1991–2020 normals, extremes 1994–present)
Month	Jan	Feb	Mar	Apr	May	Jun	Jul	Aug	Sep	Oct	Nov	Dec	Year
Record high °C (°F)	15.8 (60.4)	19.6 (67.3)	24.9 (76.8)	27.3 (81.1)	33.5 (92.3)	36.8 (98.2)	41.4 (106.5)	39.0 (102.2)	34.2 (93.6)	27.5 (81.5)	21.5 (70.7)	16.9 (62.4)	41.4 (106.5)
Mean daily maximum °C (°F)	5.9 (42.6)	7.5 (45.5)	11.4 (52.5)	15.5 (59.9)	19.0 (66.2)	22.8 (73.0)	25.4 (77.7)	25.1 (77.2)	20.9 (69.6)	15.9 (60.6)	9.9 (49.8)	6.6 (43.9)	15.5 (59.9)
Daily mean °C (°F)	3.4 (38.1)	4.3 (39.7)	7.1 (44.8)	10.1 (50.2)	13.6 (56.5)	17.0 (62.6)	19.3 (66.7)	19.1 (66.4)	15.5 (59.9)	11.9 (53.4)	7.1 (44.8)	4.1 (39.4)	11.0 (51.9)
Mean daily minimum °C (°F)	0.9 (33.6)	1.1 (34.0)	2.7 (36.9)	4.8 (40.6)	8.2 (46.8)	11.2 (52.2)	13.1 (55.6)	13.1 (55.6)	10.1 (50.2)	7.8 (46.0)	4.2 (39.6)	1.7 (35.1)	6.6 (43.9)
Record low °C (°F)	−16.0 (3.2)	−16.0 (3.2)	−11.3 (11.7)	−4.9 (23.2)	−1.4 (29.5)	1.2 (34.2)	4.8 (40.6)	3.8 (38.8)	1.2 (34.2)	−3.2 (26.2)	−11.1 (12.0)	−15.0 (5.0)	−16.0 (3.2)
Average precipitation mm (inches)	58.6 (2.31)	54.7 (2.15)	49.2 (1.94)	47.1 (1.85)	69.7 (2.74)	54.1 (2.13)	59.4 (2.34)	52.4 (2.06)	50.5 (1.99)	68.9 (2.71)	61.0 (2.40)	75.4 (2.97)	701.0 (27.60)
Average precipitation days (≥ 1.0 mm)	11.3	10.9	9.9	8.8	9.5	8.5	8.5	8.4	7.8	10.4	11.0	13.3	118.3
Source: Meteociel

== See also ==
- Communes of the Marne department
