= Paissy =

- Commune
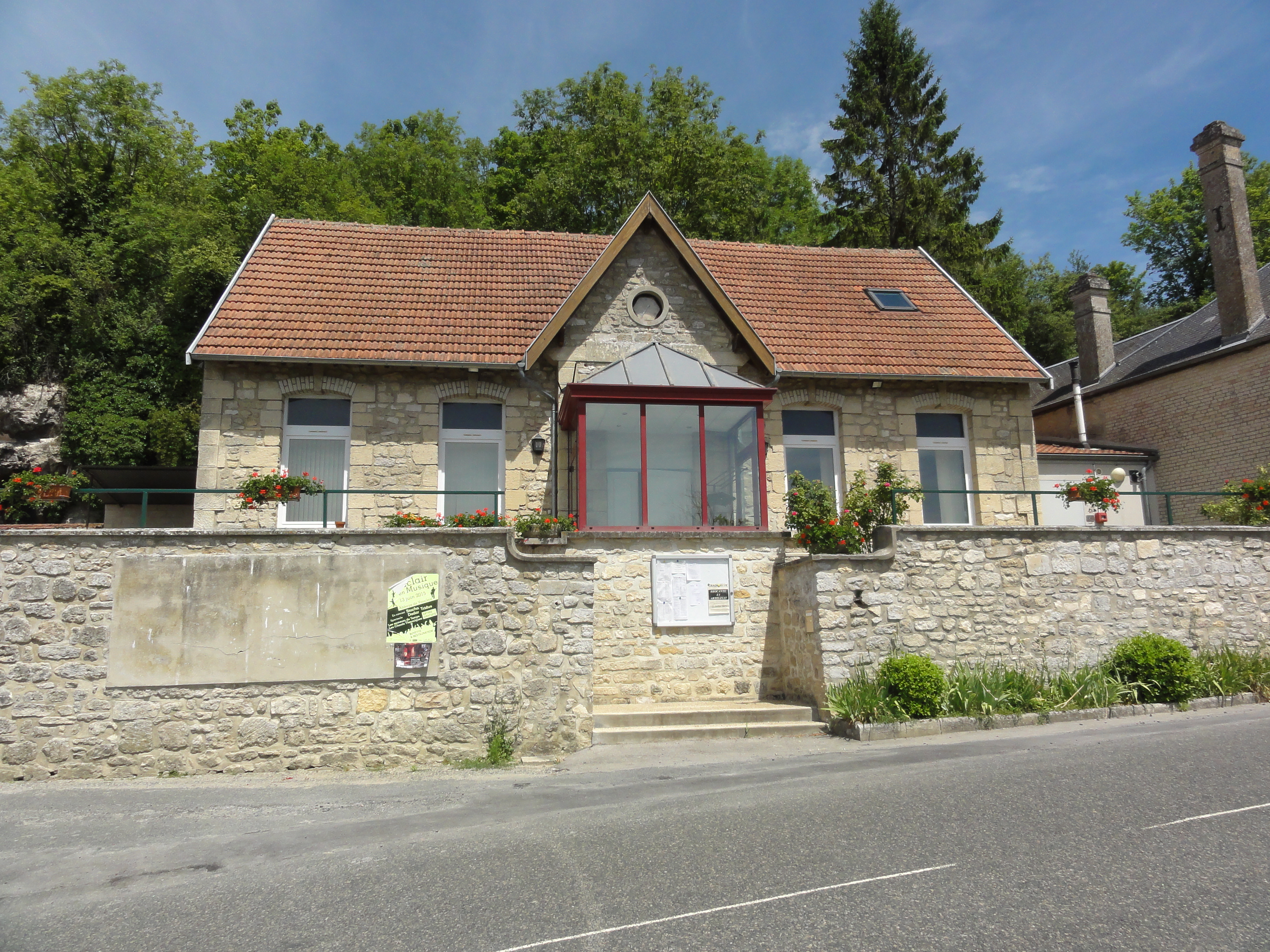
- The town hall of Paissy
- Location of Paissy
- Location within France Location within Hauts-de-France
- Coordinates: 49°25′33″N 3°42′08″E
- Country: France
- Region: Hauts-de-France
- Department: Aisne
- Arrondissement: Laon
- Canton: Villeneuve-sur-Aisne
- Intercommunality: Chemin des Dames

Government
  - Mayor (2026–32): Fabrice Beroudiaux
- Area^{1}: 7.08 km^{2} (2.73 sq mi)
- Elevation: 120 m (390 ft)
- Highest elevation: 201 m (659 ft)
- Lowest elevation: 60 m (200 ft)
- Population (2023): 80
  - Density: 11/km^{2} (29/sq mi)
- Time zone: UTC+01:00 (CET)
  - Summer (DST): UTC+02:00 (CEST)
- INSEE/Postal code: 02582 /02160
- ^{1} French Land Register data, which excludes lakes, ponds, glaciers > 1 km^{2} (0.386 sq mi or 247 acres) and river estuaries.

Paissy (French pronunciation: [pɛsi]) is a commune in the Aisne department in Hauts-de-France in northern France.

== Population ==
Historical population
Year	Pop.	±% p.a.
1968	114	—
1975	87	−3.79%
1982	73	−2.48%
1990	66	−1.25%
1999	69	+0.50%
2007	70	+0.18%
2012	68	−0.58%
2017	75	+1.98%
2023	80	+1.08%
Source: INSEE

== See also ==
- Communes of the Aisne department
