= Bergères-sous-Montmirail =

- Commune
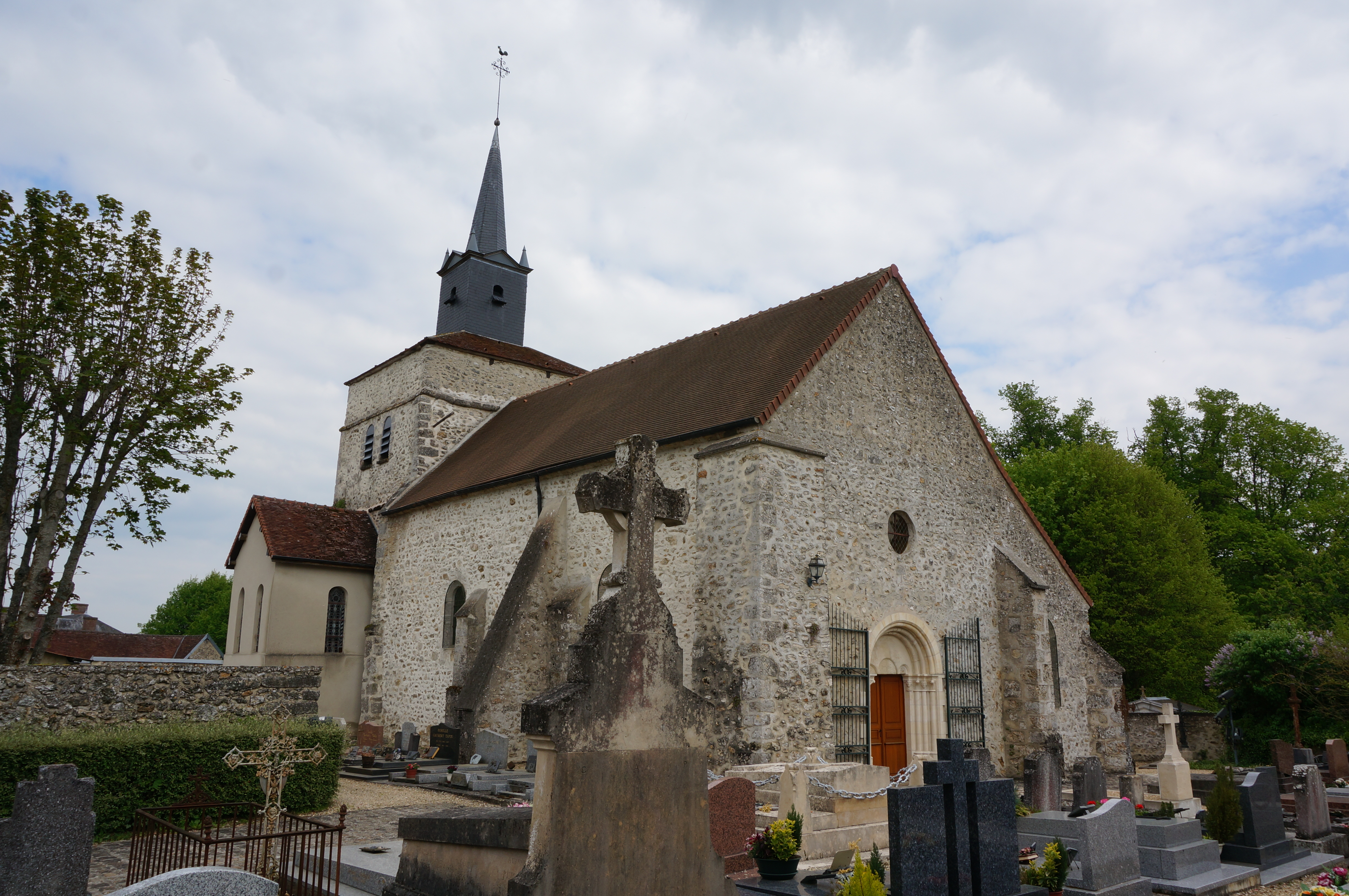
- The church in Bergères-sous-Montmirail
- Location of Bergères-sous-Montmirail
- Location within France Location within Grand Est
- Coordinates: 48°50′43″N 3°35′30″E
- Country: France
- Region: Grand Est
- Department: Marne
- Arrondissement: Épernay
- Canton: Sézanne-Brie et Champagne
- Intercommunality: Brie Champenoise

Government
  - Mayor (2020–2026): Delphine Gohin
- Area^{1}: 10.52 km^{2} (4.06 sq mi)
- Elevation: 80 m (260 ft)
- Population (2023): 137
  - Density: 13.0/km^{2} (33.7/sq mi)
- Time zone: UTC+01:00 (CET)
  - Summer (DST): UTC+02:00 (CEST)
- INSEE/Postal code: 51050 /51210
- ^{1} French Land Register data, which excludes lakes, ponds, glaciers > 1 km^{2} (0.386 sq mi or 247 acres) and river estuaries.

Bergères-sous-Montmirail (French pronunciation: [bɛʁʒɛʁ su mɔ̃miʁaj], literally Bergères under Montmirail) is a commune in the Marne department in northeastern France.

== Population ==
Historical population
Year	Pop.	±% p.a.
1968	162	—
1975	137	−2.37%
1982	133	−0.42%
1990	123	−0.97%
1999	130	+0.62%
2007	140	+0.93%
2012	131	−1.32%
2017	123	−1.25%
2023	137	+1.81%
Source: INSEE

== See also ==
- Communes of the Marne department

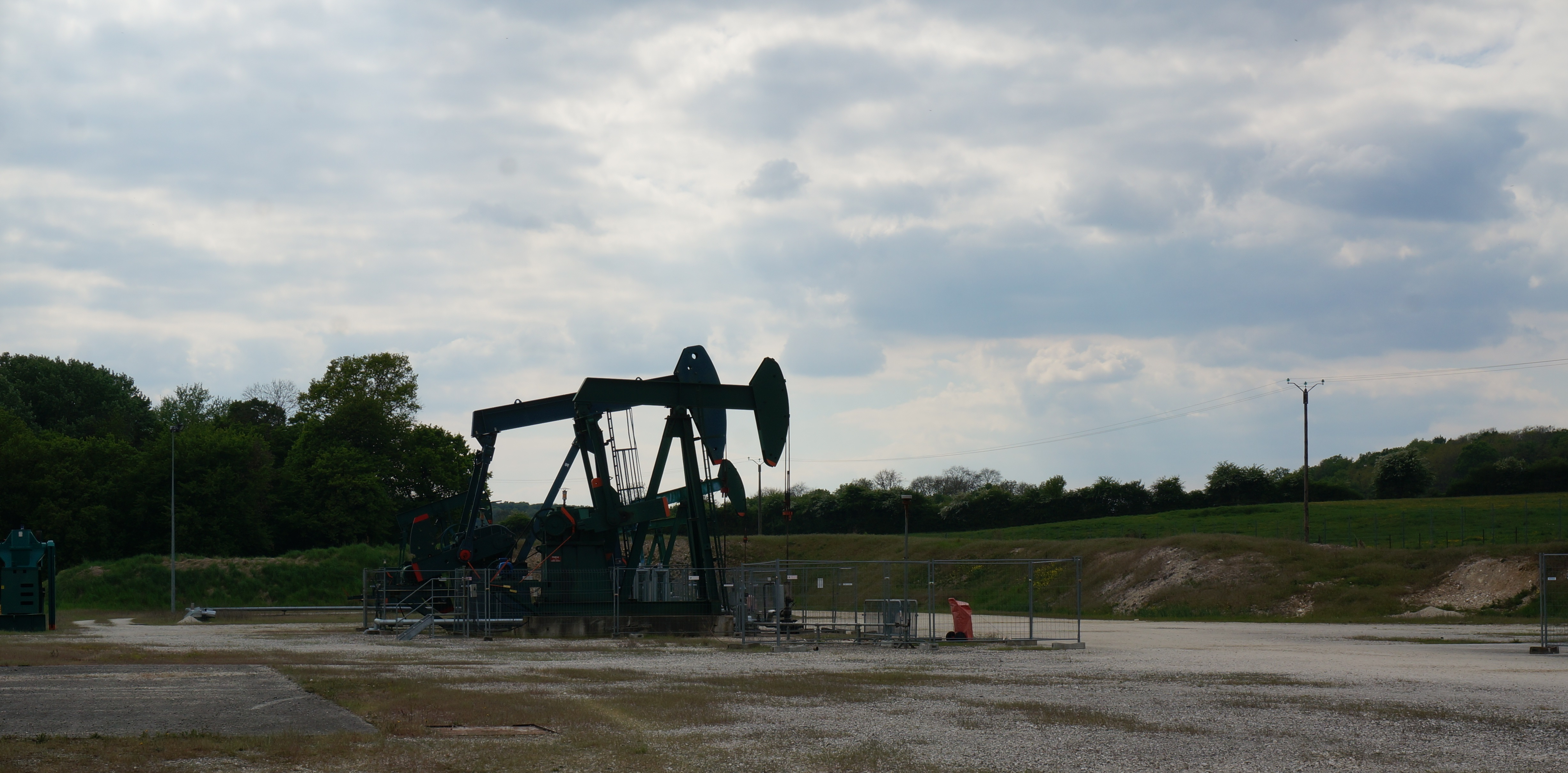
Oil.
