= Vic-sur-Aisne =

- Commune
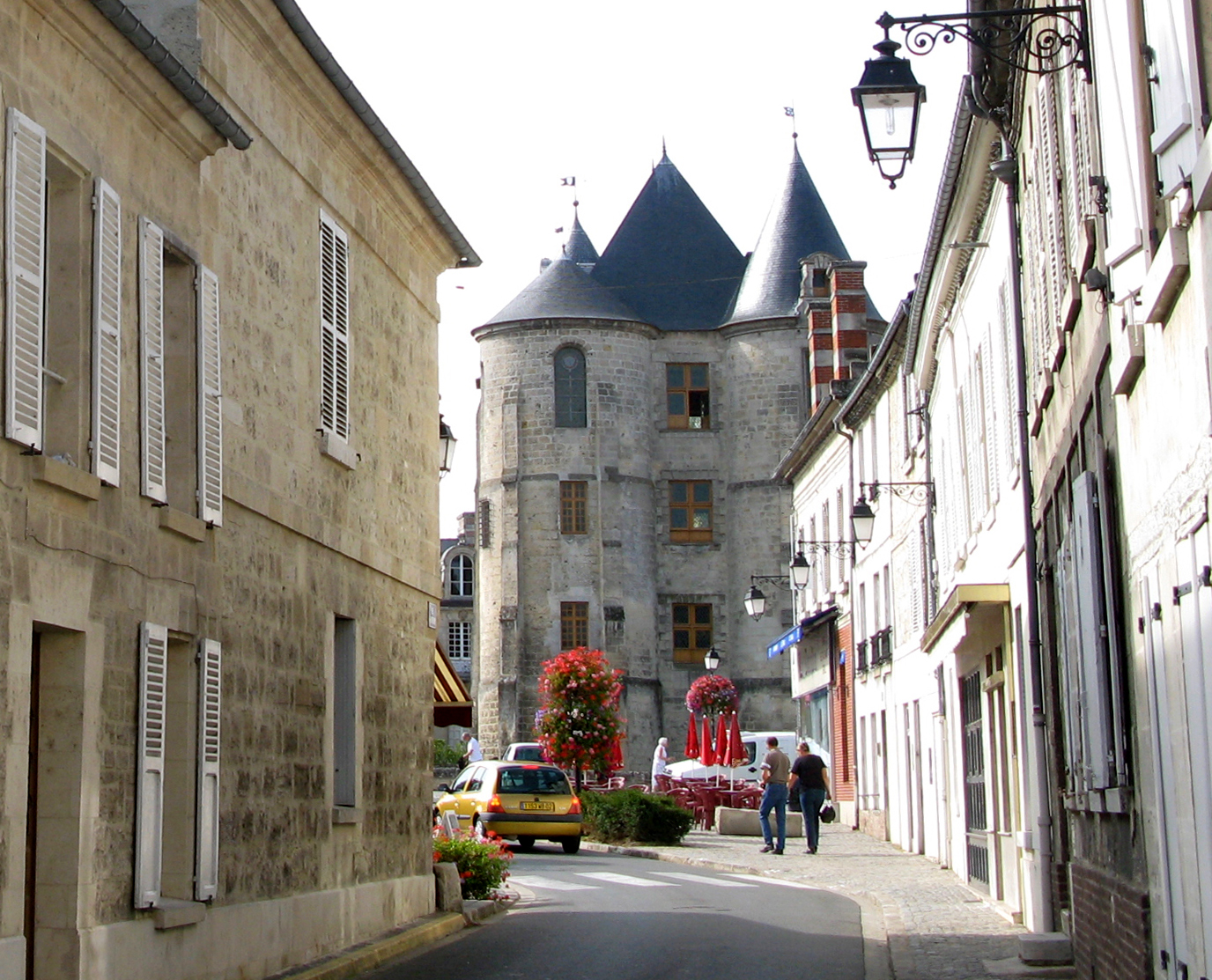
- The keep of Vic-sur-Aisne

- Coat of arms
- Location of Vic-sur-Aisne
- Location within France Location within Hauts-de-France
- Coordinates: 49°24′23″N 3°06′56″E
- Country: France
- Region: Hauts-de-France
- Department: Aisne
- Arrondissement: Soissons
- Canton: Vic-sur-Aisne

Government
  - Mayor (2026–32): Christophe Bukwa
- Area^{1}: 5.23 km^{2} (2.02 sq mi)
- Elevation: 50 m (160 ft)
- Highest elevation: 143 m (469 ft)
- Lowest elevation: 36 m (118 ft)
- Population (2023): 1,608
  - Density: 307/km^{2} (796/sq mi)
- Time zone: UTC+01:00 (CET)
  - Summer (DST): UTC+02:00 (CEST)
- INSEE/Postal code: 02795 /02290
- ^{1} French Land Register data, which excludes lakes, ponds, glaciers > 1 km^{2} (0.386 sq mi or 247 acres) and river estuaries.

Vic-sur-Aisne (French pronunciation: [vik syʁ ɛːn]; Picard: Vic-su-Ainne; literally "Vic on Aisne") is a commune in the Aisne department in Hauts-de-France in northern France, approximately 100 kilometres northeast of Paris.

== Population ==
Historical population
Year	Pop.	±% p.a.
1968	1,388	—
1975	1,526	+1.36%
1982	1,685	+1.43%
1990	1,775	+0.65%
1999	1,791	+0.10%
2007	1,718	−0.52%
2012	1,751	+0.38%
2017	1,645	−1.24%
2023	1,608	−0.38%
Source: INSEE

== See also ==
- Communes of the Aisne department
