= 73rd Infantry Regiment (France) =

The 73rd Line Infantry Regiment (73e régiment d'infanterie de ligne) is a French infantry regiment.

== History ==
Raised in 1673 as the régiment de Listenay, it was renamed the régiment Royal Comtois in 1685. It held the latter name until 1791. It was stationed at Béthune and Aire sur la Lys between 1870 and 1914, and was stationed at the latter on the outbreak of the First World War, as part of the 3rd Infantry Brigade, 2nd Infantry Division, 1st Army Corps, participating in the fighting in the marshes of Saint Gond. It was in the 2nd Infantry Division until November 1916 (fighting before Combles during the battle of the Somme), when it was moved to the 51st Infantry Division, of which it remained a part of until the end of the war.

== Flag ==

The flag contains battle honours for:

- Jemappes (1792)
- Gênes (1800)
- Sevastopol (1855)
- Solferino (1859)
- Verdun (1916)
- Flanders/Passchendaele (1917)
- The Aisne (1918)
