= Battle of Charleroi (1940) =

Battle in Belgium during the German invasion of France and the Low Countries in 1940

- Part of the Battle of France and the German invasion of Belgium during the Second World War
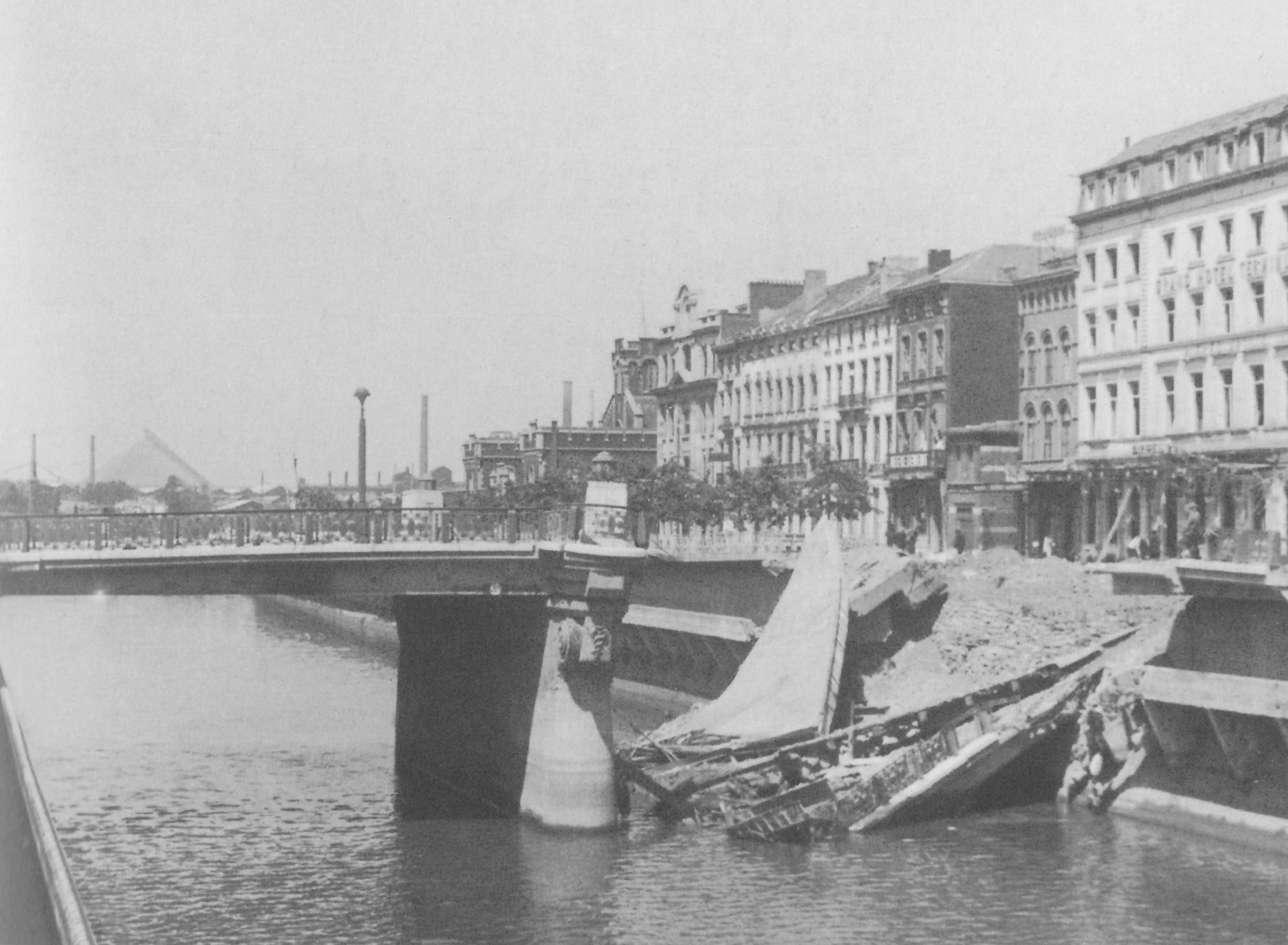
- The Gare bridge in Charleroi, partly collapsed in May 1940 after being blown up by the French Army.
Date	16–17 May 1940
Location	Around Charleroi, Belgium
Result	French tactical delaying action; German occupation of Charleroi

Belligerents
France	Germany

Commanders and leaders
(French Third Republic) Colonel Mesny; (French Third Republic) Colonel Oger; (French Third Republic) Commandant Guillebaud; (French Third Republic) Lieutenant-Colonel Galtier	Unknown

Units involved
(French Third Republic) 5th North African Infantry Division; 24th Tunisian Tirailleurs Regiment; 14th Zouave Regiment; 222nd Artillery Regiment; 1st Mechanised Brigade; 22nd Colonial Artillery Regiment	German armoured and motorised elements; Artillery; Air support from the Luftwaffe

The Battle of Charleroi was fought on 16 and 17 May 1940 in and around the Belgian city of Charleroi, during the Battle of France in the Second World War. The engagement took place during the German execution of Fall Gelb or Case Yellow, a plan intended to draw British and French forces north into Belgium while German armoured forces crossed the Ardennes and advanced towards the English Channel, threatening to encircle the Allied armies.

The fighting around Charleroi centred on the crossings of the Sambre and the Charleroi–Brussels Canal. French troops, mainly from the 5th North African Infantry Division, attempted to delay the German advance and cover the withdrawal of Allied forces. Although the French defence slowed German movement locally, Charleroi was occupied by German forces after the French retreat.

== Background ==
On 10 May 1940, Nazi Germany launched a major offensive against the Netherlands, Luxembourg, Belgium and France, beginning the Battle of France. The German plan, Fall Gelb, involved an attack by Army Group B into the Low Countries to draw the Allied armies northwards, while Army Group A launched the main armoured thrust through the Ardennes.

The Allied command responded according to the Dyle Plan, sending French and British forces into Belgium. At the same time, German armoured formations crossed the Ardennes, reached the Meuse by the evening of 12 May, and forced crossings the next day. This threatened to encircle the Allied forces in northern France and Belgium.

Charleroi, which had already been the scene of a major battle in 1914 during the First World War, again became strategically important because of its bridges over the Sambre. German forces reached the approaches to the city on 16 May 1940.

== Prelude ==
On 16 May, at 06:00, the French rearguard began to withdraw after destroying a bridge over the Sambre west of Charleroi. The withdrawal was difficult because German troops had infiltrated the left side of the position held by the 14th Zouave Regiment. The regiment lost one officer and about fifty men during the movement.

The 14th Zouave Regiment deployed in Châtelineau, while the 24th Tunisian Tirailleurs Regiment, commanded by Commandant Guillebaud, took position at Gilly and Corbeau after suffering losses from German artillery fire and air attacks.

The 22nd Colonial Artillery Regiment was deployed in the southern district of Charleroi. The command post of the 5th North African Infantry Division was established at Pironchamps. Colonel Mesny took provisional command of the division after General Augustin Agliany was evacuated from the front for medical reasons.

The main French defensive line was based on the western bank of the Charleroi Canal. It was divided into a northern sector and a southern sector, from Roux to the Sambre. Colonel Mesny decided that the defence of the Roux bridge would be assigned to the 14th Zouave Regiment, while other elements of the 5th North African Infantry Division were ordered to establish a bridgehead at Charleroi to cover the deployment of the French V Corps on the canal.

== Battle ==
On 16 May, little fighting was reported apart from several bombardments and skirmishes with German reconnaissance patrols.

On 17 May, the 14th Zouave Regiment, which had been unable to use the Roux bridge before dawn because of the retreat of the 12th Motorised Infantry Division, was attacked on its right flank by German forces. Enemy movements, including motorcyclists and armoured vehicles, were reported around Temploux and Gosselies, where they made contact with the Allied bridgehead at Charleroi.

During the morning, German motorised reconnaissance elements were stopped at Vieux Campinaire, suffering several wounded and prisoners. The 14th Zouave Regiment also disabled two German armoured cars on the Motte bridge.

French resistance reduced German pressure on Charleroi. Heavy fighting was reported around Gosselies. French troops, supported by fire from the 22nd Artillery Regiment and the 222nd Colonial Artillery Regiment, withdrew after destroying all the bridges over the Sambre.

== Aftermath ==
On 17 May, the French withdrawal became general behind the Brussels–Charleroi Canal. German forces then advanced rapidly towards Brussels, which was occupied the same day. On 18 May, Antwerp fell to the Germans.

The fighting around Charleroi was followed by the Battle of the Scheldt, which lasted from 20 to 27 May. After the defeat on the Lys, King Leopold III of Belgium decided to surrender the Belgian Army on 28 May 1940.

Charleroi remained under German occupation for four years and was liberated by the Allies in 1944.

== See also ==
- Battle of France
- German invasion of Belgium (1940)
- Battle of the Lys (1940)
- Charleroi
