= Molinié =

Molinié may refer to:

- Aimé Molinié (1908–2001), French politician; see List of senators for Ariège § Fourth Republic
- Émile Molinié (1877–c.1964), French architect
- Éric Molinié (1960–2022), French businessman
- Georges Molinié, see 2007–2009 university protests in France § Spring and Summer 2008
- Jean Molinié (1868–1936), French politician
- Jean-Baptiste Molinié (1880–1971), French general of World War II; see Siege of Lille (1940)
- Marc Molinié (born 1960), French Rallying driver; see 2016 African Rally Championship
- Marie-Dominique Molinié (1918–2002), French theologian
