= 24th Tunisian Tirailleurs Regiment =

French Army infantry regiment

- 24e régiment de tirailleurs tunisiens
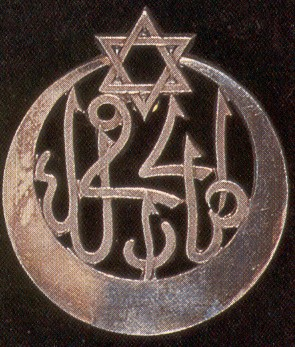
- Regimental badge of the 24th Tunisian Tirailleurs Regiment
- Active: 1914–1922; 1936–1940
- Country: France
- Branch: French Army
- Type: Regiment of tirailleurs
- Role: Infantry
- Part of: Army of Africa (France)
- Garrison/HQ: La Roche-sur-Yon
- Mottos: Sous la protection de Dieu; Under the protection of God
- Engagements: First World War; Champagne 1915; Verdun 1916; Aisne 1918; Second World War; Battle of France; Lille pocket
- Decorations: Croix de guerre 1914–1918 six palms
- Battle honours: Champagne 1915; Verdun 1916; L'Aisne 1918

Commanders
- Notable commanders: Colonel Oger; Commandant Guillebaud

The 24th Tunisian Tirailleurs Regiment (French: 24e régiment de tirailleurs tunisiens, abbreviated 24e RTT) was an infantry regiment of the French Army. It belonged to the Army of Africa and was composed as a regiment of tirailleurs

The regiment served during the First World War and was later reconstituted before the Second World War. During the Battle of France in 1940, it formed part of the French forces engaged against the German invasion and was dissolved after the Armistice of 22 June 1940.

== Creation and different names ==
- 1914
  - August: Marching Regiment of the 4th Tirailleurs, attached to the 38th Infantry Division
  - December: 4th Marching Regiment of Tirailleurs
- 1919: 24th Tirailleurs Regiment
- 1920: Renamed the 24th Tunisian Tirailleurs Regiment
- 1922: Disbanded
- 1936: Reconstituted as the 24th Tunisian Tirailleurs Regiment
- 1939: Attached to the 5th North African Infantry Division at La Roche-sur-Yon, then to the 12th Motorised Infantry Division
- 22 June 1940: Disbanded after the Armistice of 22 June 1940

== Commanding officers ==
- Colonel Oger
- Commandant Guillebaud, from 16 May 1940

== History of garrisons, campaigns and battles ==
=== Interwar period ===
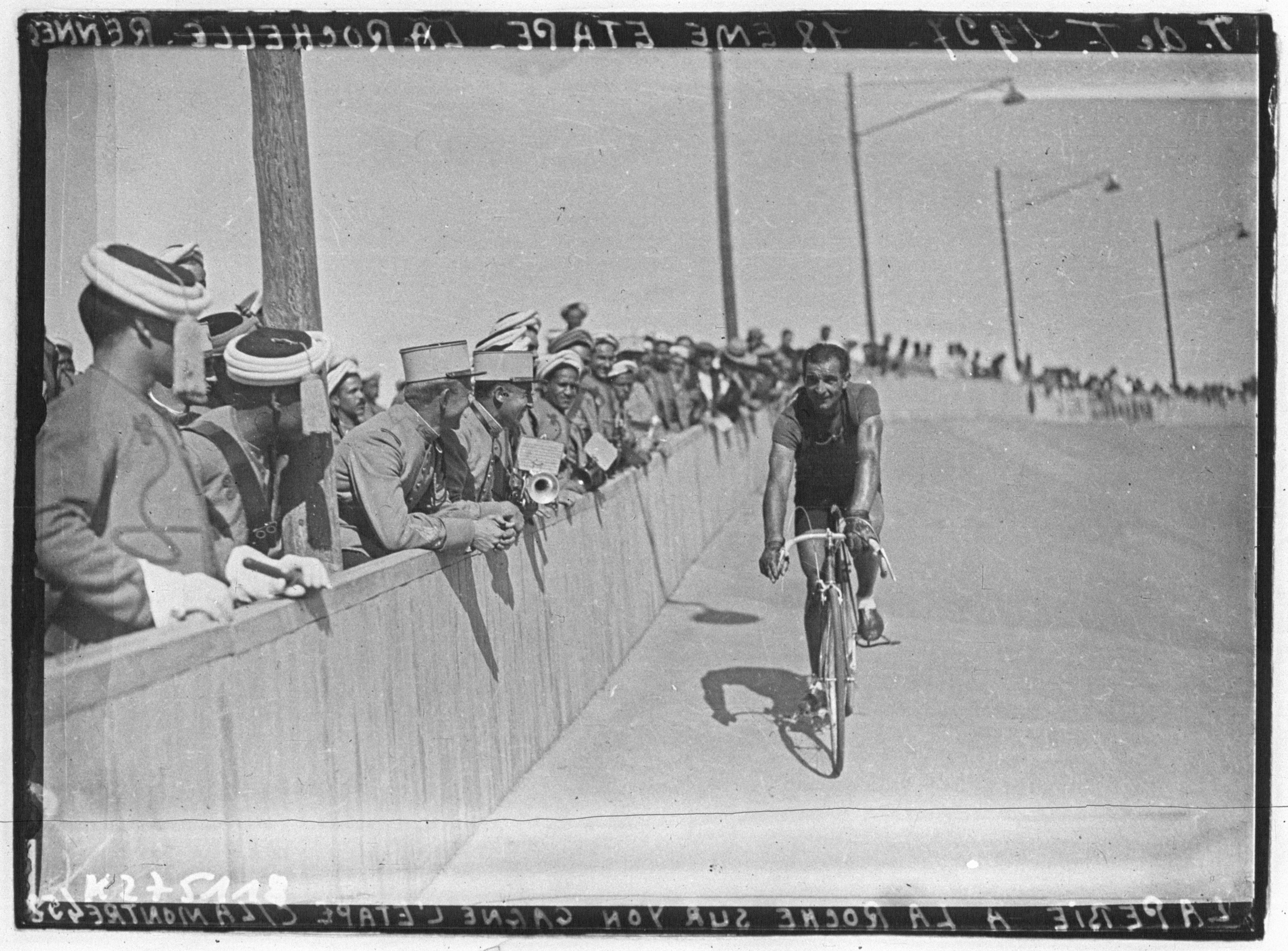
Soldiers of the 24th RTT salute the victory of Roger Lapébie in the time trial of the 1937 Tour de France at La Roche-sur-Yon.

After the First World War, the regiment was renamed the 24th Tirailleurs Regiment in 1919 and became the 24th Tunisian Tirailleurs Regiment in 1920. It was disbanded in 1922 and later reconstituted in 1936.

=== Second World War ===
==== 1939 ====
In 1939, the 24th RTT was attached to the 5th North African Infantry Division and was stationed at La Roche-sur-Yon. It later entered the composition of the 12th Motorised Infantry Division.

==== 1940 ====
On 10 May 1940, at the beginning of the German offensive in the west, the 24th RTT was part of the 5th North African Infantry Division.

During the Battle of France, the regiment took part in the fighting in northern France. From 25 to 30 May 1940, it was involved in the fighting around the Lille pocket.

The 24th RTT was dissolved after the Armistice of 22 June 1940.

== Symbols of the regiment ==
=== Regimental flag ===
The flag of the regiment bore, sewn in gold letters in its folds, the following battle honours:

- Champagne 1915
- Verdun 1916
- L'Aisne 1918

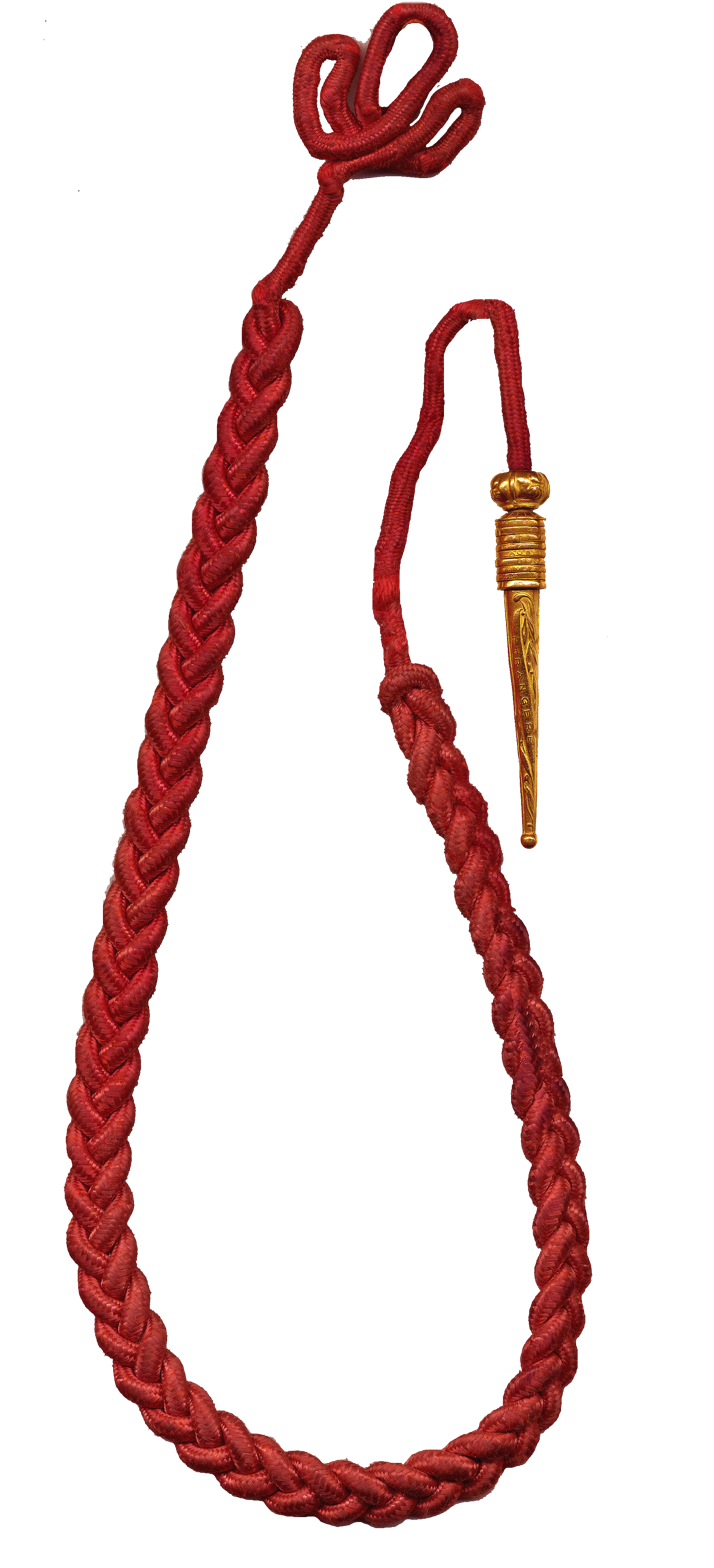
Fourragère in the colours of the Legion of Honour

The regiment was entitled to wear the Fourragère in the colours of the ribbon of the Legion of Honour.

== Notable personnel ==
- Paul Soutiras, French officer killed in action in 1940.

== See also ==
- Army of Africa (France)
- Tirailleur
- French Army
- Battle of France
