= Gottlob Berger =

German senior Nazi official (1896–1975)

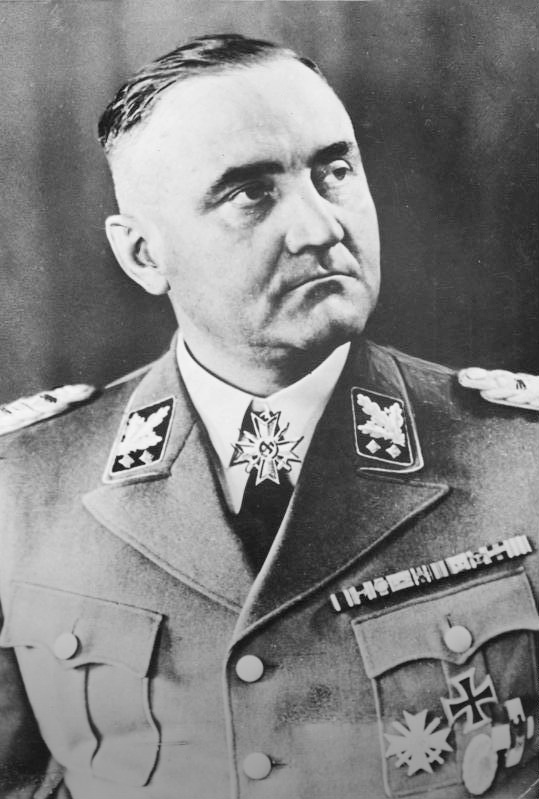
- Berger in 1944
- Born: Gottlob Christian Berger; 16 July 1896; Gerstetten, near Ulm, Kingdom of Württemberg
- Died: 5 January 1975 (aged 78); Gerstetten, West Germany
- Spouse: Maria Dambach (m. 1921)
- Military career
- Allegiance: German Empire; Nazi Germany
- Branch: Imperial German Army; Sturmabteilung; Schutzstaffel; Allgemeine-SS; Waffen-SS
- Service years: 1914–1945
- Rank: SS-Obergruppenführer und General der Waffen-SS
- Nicknames: Praise God; Duke of Swabia; Almighty Gottlob
- Commands: SS Main Office
- Conflicts: World War I; World War II
- Awards: Knight's Cross of the War Merit Cross with Swords; Knight's Cross of the Württemberg Military Order of Merit; Iron Cross First Class; German Cross in Silver; Social Welfare Decoration; Golden Party Badge
- Other work: Writer
- Criminal information
- Convictions: War crimes Crimes against humanity
- Trial: Ministries Trial
- Penalty: 25 years imprisonment (commuted; released after 6.5 years)

Gottlob Christian Berger (16 July 1896 – 5 January 1975) was a German senior Nazi official who was the chief of the SS Main Office responsible for Schutzstaffel (SS) recruiting during World War II. At the post-war Ministries Trial, Berger was convicted for war crimes and crimes against humanity and spent six and a half years in prison.

While serving in the German Army during World War I, he was wounded four times and awarded the Iron Cross First Class. Immediately after the war, he was a leader of the Einwohnerwehr militia in his native North Württemberg. He joined the Nazi Party in 1922 but lost interest in right-wing politics during the 1920s, training and working as a physical education teacher. In the late 1920s, he rejoined the Nazi Party and became a member of the paramilitary Sturmabteilung (SA) in 1931. He clashed with other leaders of the SA and joined the Allgemeine-SS in 1936. Initially responsible for physical education in an SS region, he was soon transferred to the staff of Reichsführer-SS Heinrich Himmler as head of the sports office.

In 1938, he was appointed as head of the recruiting office of the SS Main Office (SS-HA) and took over as chief of the SS-HA the following year. To a significant extent, Berger was the father of the Waffen-SS, as he implemented its recruiting structures and policies and later extended Waffen-SS recruiting to peoples who in no way reflected Himmler's ideas of "racial purity". He consistently advocated greater ideological training for the Waffen-SS but did not view SS ideology as a replacement for religion. He also sponsored and protected his friend Oskar Dirlewanger, whom he placed in command of the SS-Sonderkommando Dirlewanger who subsequently committed many war crimes. Berger often clashed with senior officers of the Wehrmacht and even with senior Waffen-SS officers over his recruiting methods, but he took advantage of opportunities as they presented themselves to grow the Waffen-SS to 38 divisions by the war's end. He held the rank of SS-Obergruppenführer und General der Waffen-SS (lieutenant general).

Berger undertook several other roles in the latter stages of the war while continuing as chief of the SS-HA. In the Reich Ministry for the Occupied Eastern Territories he proposed the Heuaktion operation that kidnapped and enslaved 50,000 Eastern European children. In response to the Slovak National Uprising in August 1944, Berger was appointed Military Commander in Slovakia and was in charge during the initial failure to suppress the revolt. The following month he was appointed one of the two chiefs of staff of the Volkssturm militia and as chief of the prisoner-of-war camps. In the final months of the war he commanded German forces in the Bavarian Alps, which included remnants of several of the Waffen-SS units he had helped recruit. He surrendered to U.S. troops near Berchtesgaden and was promptly arrested. He was tried and convicted in the Ministries Trial of the U.S. Nuremberg Military Tribunals for war crimes and was sentenced to 25 years imprisonment. His sentence was soon reduced to 10 years, and he was released after serving six and a half years. After release he advocated for the rehabilitation of the Waffen-SS and worked in several manufacturing businesses. He died in his hometown in 1975. Described as blustery, cynical, and "one of Himmler's most competent and trusted war-time lieutenants", Berger was also an ardent antisemite and a skilled and unscrupulous bureaucratic manipulator. Due to his organisational and recruiting skills, Berger was kept as the chief of the SS-HA throughout the war.

== Early life and involvement with Nazi Party ==
Gottlob Christian Berger was born on 16 July 1896 at Gerstetten in the Kingdom of Württemberg, the son of saw-mill owners Johannes and Christine (née Moser), and was one of eight children. He attended Volksschule (elementary school) and Realschule (junior high school) and then teacher training in Nürtingen. He volunteered for military service at the beginning of World War I, and rose to the rank of Leutnant in the infantry by the time of his discharge in 1919. Wounded four times, he was awarded the Iron Cross First Class, and was considered 70 per cent disabled at the time of his discharge. During the war, all three of his brothers died, two killed in action and the other executed as a spy in the United States. Berger's combative temperament and very conservative politics fitted him for a leadership role with the North Württemberg Einwohnerwehr militia in 1918–19. He married Maria (née Dambach) in 1921. After joining the Nazi Party in 1922, he was arrested and briefly held in custody after Adolf Hitler's Munich Beer Hall Putsch in November 1923. He trained and worked as a physical education teacher, despite his injuries, and lost interest in politics for some years, before rejoining the Nazi Party in 1929, and the paramilitary Sturmabteilung (SA) in January 1931.

Berger's SA career was limited by his soldierly ideas of politics and leadership, but after the Nazi seizure of power in January 1933, he was found to be very suitable to lead Schutzhaft operations, which involved the rounding up of Jews and "political undesirables". In April 1933, his clashes with younger leaders meant his SA career had met a dead-end. His SA peers criticised Berger's ambitious nature, outspokenness and lack of self-reflection. Beginning in July 1934, Berger worked with the SA training chief SA-Obergruppenführer Friedrich-Wilhelm Krüger. Between 1933 and 1935, he was a school inspector in Esslingen am Neckar near Stuttgart, and in 1935 was a senior official in the Gau Württemberg – Hohenzollern Ministry of Culture. He was recruited into the Allgemeine-SS by Reichsführer-SS Heinrich Himmler in 1936, on Krüger's recommendation. Initially appointed to oversee sports and physical training for SS-Oberabschnitt Südwest (SS Regional Headquarters Southwest), he then moved to Himmler's personal staff as head of the sports office.

Berger interceded on behalf of his World War I comrade Oskar Dirlewanger, who had been imprisoned for two years in 1935 for offences against a minor. On his release from prison, Berger used his influence to ensure Dirlewanger could join the Condor Legion and fight in the Spanish Civil War.

On 1 July 1938, Himmler appointed Berger as chief of the recruiting department of the SS-Hauptamt (SS Main Office, or SS-HA), which he quickly developed into a powerful tool for Himmler's ambitions. According to Berger, the German Army was initially dismissive of the idea of SS combat troops. He quoted the Commander-in-Chief of the Army, Generaloberst Werner von Fritsch as saying, "If the Reich Transport Minister has his militarily-trained Railway Police, why shouldn't Himmler also play at soldiers?"

Berger later claimed that he had come up with the idea of SS combat troops wearing camouflage jackets from his own hunting days, and had suggested it to SS-Obergruppenführer Sepp Dietrich, commander of the Leibstandarte SS Adolf Hitler Regiment (LSSAH). From 1938, various forms of Flecktarn camouflage were issued. The author Adrian Weale doubts Berger's account.

Berger had achieved the rank of Major der Reserve in the Wehrmacht by 1938, but his initial rank upon joining the Allgemeine-SS was SS-Standartenführer, based upon his SA service. Berger played a key role in directing the fifth column Sudetendeutsches Freikorps during the Sudeten Crisis in Czechoslovakia in 1938, and the organisational skills he displayed there marked him as highly suitable for the SS recruiting role.

== Chief of the SS-Hauptamt ==
=== 1939–40 ===
==== Initial expansion of the Waffen-SS ====
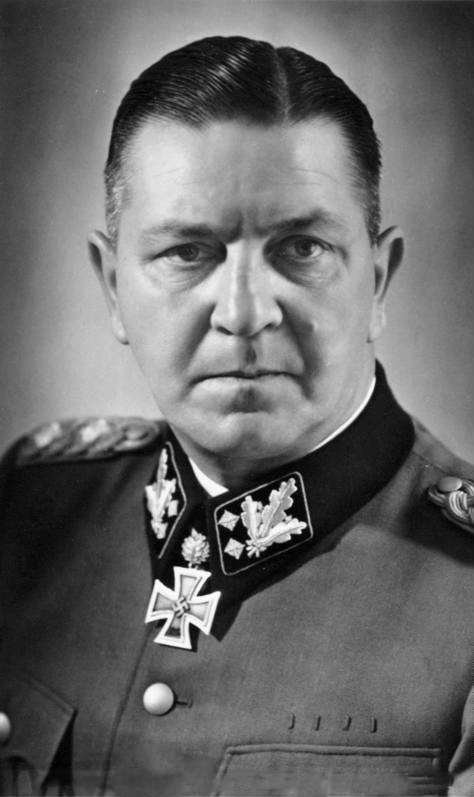
The Inspector of Concentration Camps, Theodor Eicke, was appointed to command the new SS Division-Totenkopf, which was formed using personnel from the SS-TV

Prior to the outbreak of World War II, the SS-HA had been responsible for organising an erstwhile "civilian" political organisation, the Allgemeine-SS. After the war began, it was clear that those departments of the SS-HA looking after the SS-Verfügungstruppe (SS dispositional troops or SS-VT) had performed poorly. During the invasion of Poland, deficiencies in organisation, equipment and training had become obvious. The SS-HA, and specifically its chief, SS-Obergruppenführer August Heissmeyer, were held responsible, and Heissmeyer soon made way for Berger. As head of recruiting, Berger had already unified the recruiting system for the three main SS organisations, the Allgemeine-SS, SS-VT and police, and in August 1938 he negotiated a recruiting agreement between Himmler and the Reichsjugendführer (Reich Youth Leader) Baldur von Schirach which created a strong recruiting pathway for the young men of the Hitler Youth into the SS.

Following the Polish campaign, Hitler approved the expansion of the SS combat troops to three divisions as well as bringing the LSSAH up to the strength of a reinforced motorised regiment. To achieve this goal before the commencement of the planned invasion of France and the Low Countries, Berger needed at least partially trained personnel. To do this, he circumvented the recruiting primacy of the Wehrmacht by transferring men from forces already under Himmler's control, the SS-Totenkopfverbände (SS-TV) that ran the concentration camps, and combat-trained police reinforcements of the Ordnungspolizei (Order Police or Orpo). By adding these men to the LSSAH and the existing three regiments of the SS-VT, he expanded the force to the approved ceiling, including 50,000 trained replacements. The three new divisions were: the SS-Verfügungs-Division (later given the name Reich and then Das Reich) commanded by the Inspector of the SS-VT, SS-Gruppenführer Paul Hausser; the SS-Division-Totenkopf commanded by the Inspector of Concentration Camps, SS-Gruppenführer Theodor Eicke; and the Polizei-Division, commanded by SS-Gruppenführer und Generalleutnant der Polizei Karl Pfeffer-Wildenbruch. This rapid transformation was theoretical to a significant extent, as Eicke and the SS-TV continued to resist exchanges of personnel with the SS-VT.

The fact that Berger was able to expand the SS combat troops so quickly was a tribute to his improvisational skills. On 1 December 1939, Himmler promoted Berger to chief of the SS-HA. To a significant extent, Berger was the "father" of the Waffen-SS (or Armed SS), a term he coined in an agreement dated 2 March 1940. He used the new term to smooth over friction between the SS-VT and SS-TV, as they were combined in new formations. Berger's new-found authority for SS recruiting matters irritated the chiefs of the Allgemeine-SS districts, who had previously been responsible for this function. This came to a head when the chief of SS-Oberabschnitt Südwest, SS-Gruppenführer Kurt Kaul refused to recognise Berger's delegate in his district, referring to Berger as a "low-ranking empire builder". Kaul's series of letters to Berlin came to nothing, as the power and influence of the Allgemeine-SS had waned with the outbreak of war and the conscription of many of its members into the Wehrmacht, Waffen-SS and police. Ultimately, when Kaul threatened to arrest Berger's delegate in SS-Oberabschnitt Südwest, Himmler intervened personally in February 1940, stating that "the most unpleasant consequences" would befall Kaul if he did not throw his support behind Berger and his recruiting organisation. Kaul acquiesced, and Berger's supremacy as SS recruiting supremo was firmly established.

==== The first "Germanic" recruits ====
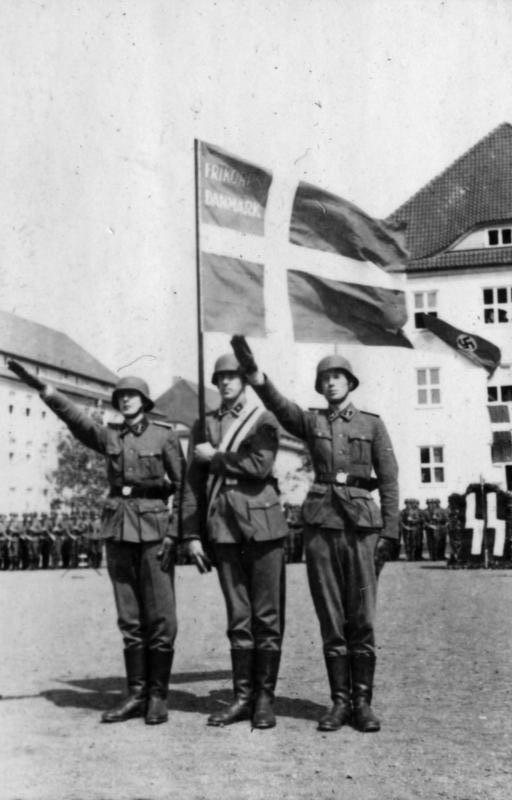
Danish recruits joining the Waffen-SS in 1941

Despite this success, Berger still had to negotiate with the Wehrmacht, which opposed his attempts to expand the Waffen-SS at almost every turn. In early 1940, Himmler and Berger were outmaneuvered by Generaloberst Wilhelm Keitel, Chief of Oberkommando der Wehrmacht (Wehrmacht High Command or OKW) on a number of issues around Waffen-SS recruiting, reflecting the strong influence the Wehrmacht still had with Hitler. On 20 April 1940, Berger was promoted to SS-Brigadeführer. According to Berger, Himmler never intended that the Waffen-SS would supplant the Army, and after the war he intended that it would be reduced to seven active and five reserve divisions. Berger created a recruiting structure throughout the Reich, mirroring that of the Army, but while the Wehrmacht, which controlled the draft, was willing to allow Berger enough recruits to maintain the three divisions and the LSSAH, it did not want to see any further expansion. To get around this, Berger had to look outside the Reich.

By this time, the Waffen-SS numbered just under 125,000, of whom more than 40,000 originated from post-Anschluss Austria and other areas outside the pre-1933 borders of Germany. In April 1940, the Germans had invaded and occupied Denmark and Norway, opening up a source of "Nordic" or "Germanic" recruits, which Berger was quick to exploit. After the invasion of France and the Low Countries, the resulting regiment, SS-Nordland, was joined by a Dutch-Belgian-Flemish regiment, SS-Westland. At the same time as they were recruiting for these "Germanic" regiments, Berger's delegates were also focusing on gaining ethnic German volunteers from outside the Reich, men not subject to the Wehrmacht-controlled draft. In May, more than 1,000 Romanian Volksdeutsche had been recruited, with the help of Andreas Schmidt, Berger's son-in-law and the political leader of the Romanian Volksdeutsche. Three weeks after the invasion of Belgium, Berger was appointed as the president of the German-sponsored pro-Nazi Belgian political party, DeVlag, in Flanders. Berger also worked to bring the Yugoslav Volksdeutsche under the influence of the SS, which he was able to achieve six months prior to the invasion of that country by the Axis in April 1941. Berger's recruiting work with the Flemish and Croatian communities was facilitated by his chairmanship of both the Deutsche-Flämischen Studiengruppe (German-Flemish Studies Group) and the Deutsche-Kroatischen Gesellschaft (German-Croatian Society).

==== Friction with the Wehrmacht ====
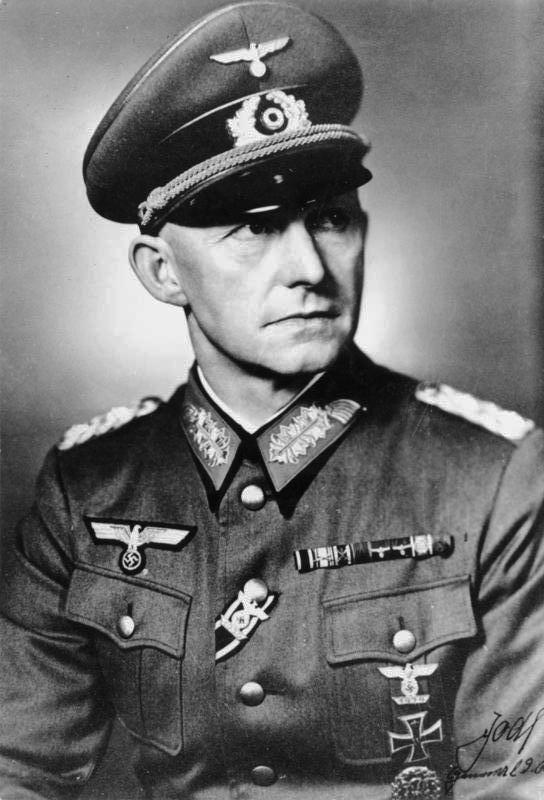
Alfred Jodl of the Oberkommando der Wehrmacht took a dim view of Berger's diversion of potential Wehrmacht recruits to the SS

By the end of May 1940, Berger had filled the authorised quota of new recruits, but his recruiters kept signing up young men to create a reserve that could replace the many older Allgemeine-SS reservists in the three field divisions. To supplement this pool, Berger also continued recruiting for the SS-TV and police regiments, which were not under Wehrmacht control, and were still below the strengths approved by Hitler. This continued to create friction between the Wehrmacht and SS, as potential Wehrmacht recruits were siphoned off to forces under Himmler's control. By a range of methods, Berger diverted manpower from the younger age groups, and also targeted areas outside the Reich that were not subject to Wehrmacht recruiting controls.

Berger's evasion of Wehrmacht-imposed recruiting restrictions came to a head in June, when the Chief of the OKW Operations Staff, Generalmajor Alfred Jodl initiated an investigation of SS recruiting operations within the Reich. The result was that around 15,000 SS inductions were held up by various Wehrmacht military district headquarters. Berger became aware of Jodl's inquiry and advised Himmler that even their inquiries had underestimated his success, giving the example that the Wehrmacht believed he had exceeded the June quota for SS-Division-Totenkopf by 900 men, when in fact the true figure was 1,164. He boasted to Himmler that during the whole recruiting campaign, he had signed up 15,000 men for SS-Division-Totenkopf, when Hitler had only authorised the recruiting of 4,000 for the division in the same period. To justify his actions, Berger pointed to the fact that, just before the French surrender, Hitler had ordered the release of over-age SS reservists. In the SS-Division-Totenkopf, this meant 13,246 of the 20,000-strong formation.

Berger had been remarkably successful, despite the obstacles placed in his path by the Wehrmacht, having recruited nearly 60,000 men for the Waffen-SS between mid-January and the end of June. These fresh troops were more than sufficient to replace those released when Himmler demobilised several categories of SS reservists in late July. But Himmler knew that the future of the Waffen-SS was assured; Hitler was already considering invading the Soviet Union.

==== Reorganisation ====
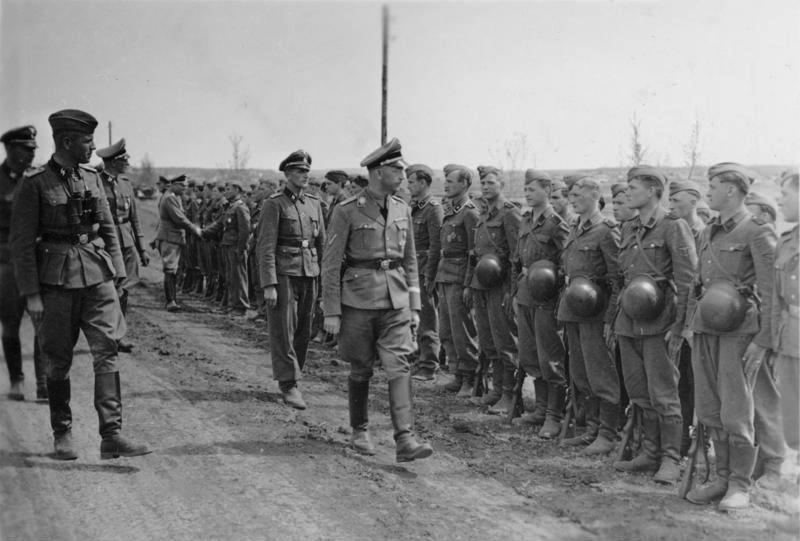
Himmler inspecting the SS Division Wiking in September 1942. The "Germanic" regiments SS-Nordland and SS-Westland had been used to form the division at the end of 1940.

In August 1940, Berger reorganised the SS-HA to focus better on its main role of recruiting for the Waffen-SS, creating separate sections to deal with recruiting inside and outside the Reich. The section targeting recruits from outside of the Reich developed out of a briefing he received from the Chief of the SS-Führungshauptamt (SS Command Main Office, or SS-FHA) SS-Brigadeführer Hans Jüttner on Hitler's expectations of the Waffen-SS for the upcoming invasion of the Soviet Union, which included the raising of a fourth division and the expansion of the LSSAH to a motorised brigade. Berger realised that the Wehrmacht quotas for the Waffen-SS would fall short of its manpower needs by at least 6,000 per year.

Berger's SS-HA had a problematic relationship with the SS-FHA, which was responsible for organising, training and equipping the Waffen-SS. The SS-FHA wanted the Waffen-SS to be a small elite corps, but Berger and Himmler knew that Hitler needed as many divisions as possible, even if that meant some Waffen-SS formations would be of lesser quality. Jüttner's initial efforts at integrating the recruits from western Europe and Scandinavia were inadequate, with insufficient emphasis on training and appointing officers and non-commissioned officers from the ranks of the new recruits. The SS-FHA had also paid scant attention to retention of ranks for former members of national armed forces, liaison with home territories, and even mail. Berger's well-researched report to Himmler on these failures was damning, and the Reichsführer-SS soon issued detailed instructions on the handling of these new recruits, from the moment they joined the Waffen-SS. Berger's criticisms of Jüttner must be seen in the light of the advantages Berger considered he would achieve if Jüttner's position with Himmler was weakened.

One of the obvious sources for Waffen-SS manpower was the nearly 40,000 troops of the SS-TV regiments, which consisted of youths below conscription age for the Wehrmacht, as well as older Allgemeine-SS reservists. These regiments were under Himmler's control, and were deployed across German-occupied Europe as political police, but the security functions they carried out were clearly within the capabilities of the Orpo. In late 1940, in order to ensure that Himmler's instructions were carried out, Berger established a special camp at Sennheim in occupied Alsace, where non-Reich German recruits could be brought up to physical standards and ideologically indoctrinated prior to Waffen-SS training. This was an attempt to address the concerns of some commanders about the quality of these recruits, and their ability to be integrated into units composed mostly of Reich Germans. Recruits sent to this camp included Volksdeutsche (ethnic Germans from outside the Reich), Danes, Norwegians, Dutch and Flemings. Berger also created a network of offices throughout German-occupied Europe to ensure the welfare of the families of such recruits, influence the local communities to support Waffen-SS recruiting, and prepare potential recruits for indoctrination. This network and its activities was strongly resisted by the Main Welfare Office for Ethnic Germans (German: Hauptamt Volksdeutsche Mittelstelle or VoMi) the Nazi Party arm responsible for guiding the ethnic German communities outside the Reich. Himmler, unhappy with the work of VoMi in supporting SS recruiting, did not abolish VoMi, he just authorised Berger to circumvent it.

By the end of 1940, SS-Nordland and SS-Westland had become the basis for the formation of the fourth division, SS-Division Wiking. Casting about for another source of recruits, Berger struck upon the idea of enlisting convicted criminals, who were concentrated in the Sonderkommando Dirlewanger, commanded by Berger's friend, Dirlewanger. Dirlewanger had returned from Spain and been reinstated as a SS-Standartenfuhrer der Reserve in the Allgemeine-SS at Berger's instigation. In September 1940, Dirlewanger's unit had been deployed to the area of occupied Poland, where they established defensive positions and provided guards for a Jewish labour camp.

=== 1941 ===
In March 1941, Berger founded the German Guidance Office which was responsible for the recruitment of "Germanic" men for the Waffen-SS. The German Guidance Office encompassed the camp at Sennheim, as well as the network of recruiting offices already established throughout occupied Europe, and became a separate department of the SS-HA, with separate sections for leadership, recruiting and education, and six regional sub-sections.

After the Balkan Campaign of April 1941, the LSSAH was expanded to divisional strength, and following the commencement of the invasion of the Soviet Union, a sixth Waffen-SS division, SS-Division Nord was formed from four of the former "SS-Totenkopf" regiments, all of which had been re-designated "SS Infantry" regiments. These new divisions had an initial strength only two-thirds of that of the original divisions. The Polizei-Division was also renamed the SS-Polizei-Division. The expectations on Berger's recruiting network continued to increase, just as casualties began to mount in earnest.

==== The West Europeans ====
In early April 1941, Hitler had agreed to the creation of the SS-Freiwilligenstandarte Nordwest (SS Volunteer Regiment Northwest), with an authorised strength of 2,500 men recruited from Flanders and the Netherlands. This formation capitalised on the push for an autonomous Flemish-Dutch region within the Reich. Significant proponents of such a union were Anton Mussert of the National Socialist Movement in the Netherlands and Staf De Clercq of the Flemish National League. In this, Berger was exploiting Mussert and De Clerq, because he was actually working towards Hitler's idea of incorporating Flanders and Wallonia into the Reich as two Gaue, not a unified autonomous entity.

At the end of April, Himmler ordered Berger to obtain 20,000 new recruits for the Waffen-SS by the end of May. With Hitler's authorisation, the recruitment quotas were lifted by the Wehrmacht, allowing Berger an essentially free hand for a limited time. He did not disappoint, misleading the new recruits as to the length of their service obligation, and signing up 22,361 new troops by 29 May, many of whom were only 18 years old. To meet Himmler's target, Berger had also called up eligible members of the Allgemeine-SS and intensified efforts to recruit western Europeans. The latter initiative proved disappointing, with only 2,000 of the total coming from that source. A total of 400 Finnish combat veterans also volunteered to join the Waffen-SS in this period, and they were sent to join the SS-Division-Wiking.

==== The "national legions" ====
In June 1941, just after the commencement of Operation Barbarossa, Hitler decreed that the Waffen-SS could recruit foreigners for service on the Eastern Front. He wanted a legion to be raised from each of the occupied countries of Western Europe, but Himmler was only interested in recruiting "Germanic" people into the Waffen-SS. Himmler decided that there were large numbers of potential pro-German but nationalistic recruits available from the "Germanic" races in occupied countries, and directed Berger to explore this manpower source. As a result of Himmler's decision, the Wehrmacht was permitted to recruit Frenchmen, Spaniards and Croats, while Dutch, Flemish, Swedish, Norwegian and Danish men were Berger's domain. The "national legions" each numbered 1,000, except the Netherlands Legion, which had a maximum strength of 2,000. In November 1941, the Netherlands Legion and Flemish Legion had completed light infantry training and were sent to join the 2nd SS Infantry Brigade on the Leningrad Front. While these troops swore a personal oath to Hitler and were subject to SS rules and regulations, they were not members of the SS, and wore national symbols in place of the sig runes. Berger even went so far as to recommend to Himmler that Flemings no longer be treated as foreigners, but be given full citizenship rights as Germans.

The idea of having "national legions" was poorly managed, with some recruits being tricked into enlisting, and many of the new recruits being badly treated by their German instructors. Once news of this reached their home territories, the limited flow of pro-German volunteers dried up. The SS-FHA failed to carry through the commitments made to the men of the "national legions" when they enlisted, and combined with mistreatment and abuse from their German cadre staff and instructors, this had a negative impact on morale and the willingness of more men to volunteer. This was something from which the "national legions" never fully recovered, despite Himmler's intervention at Berger's behest. However, due to the expansion of SS recruiting rights in areas outside the Reich and the failure of the Wehrmacht to capitalise on recruiting opportunities afforded them, several of the "national legions" recruited by the Wehrmacht were eventually transferred to the Waffen-SS.

==== A Volksdeutsche division ====
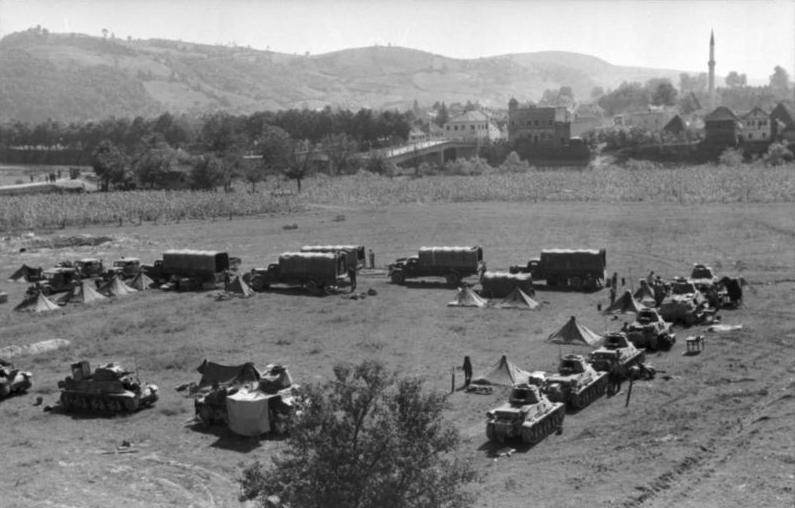
The 7th SS Volunteer Mountain Division Prinz Eugen camped on the outskirts of a Bosnian town

Encouraged by the success he had achieved in Romania in 1940 with the help of his son-in-law, Berger had proposed to Himmler that the next recruiting sphere be the Volksdeutsche communities of Romania, Hungary and Yugoslavia, which together contained about 1.5 million ethnic Germans. Little could be done to further this proposal until mid-1941, by which time Yugoslavia had been overrun by the Axis, and Romania and Hungary had joined the pact. Immediately after the lightning-quick defeat of Yugoslavia in April 1941, Hausser was being pressed to accept Yugoslav Volksdeutsche into his renamed SS-Division-Reich, even before it was withdrawn to prepare for Operation Barbarossa. On his way back to Germany from Yugoslavia, Hausser had transited through Romania and gathered another 600 ethnic German volunteers who he smuggled out of the country.

Not content with this fairly minor and surreptitious recruiting effort, Berger proposed to raise a seventh Waffen-SS division from the ethnic Germans of Yugoslavia. By the end of 1941, faced with the Partisan-led uprising in Yugoslavia, Hitler authorised the raising of the SS-Freiwilligen-Division Prinz Eugen. It was to be the first of the many "foreign" divisions that would dramatically change the composition of the Waffen-SS during the remainder of the war. The division was formed around an existing SS-controlled Selbstschutz (militia) drawn from ethnic Germans in the Banat, but Berger had misread the willingness of the local ethnic German population to volunteer for service outside their homeland. His recruiters initially struggled to attract volunteers, so coercion was applied, and ultimately, the Banat was declared to be under German sovereignty, and Himmler approved conscription on the basis of an archaic law, the Tiroler Landsturmordnung (Tyrolean General Levy Act) of 1872.

=== 1942 ===
On 29 January 1942, Himmler issued an order which re-titled Dirlewanger's unit as SS-Sonderkommando Dirlewanger, and formally incorporated it into the Waffen-SS. Later that year, when an SS judge issued an arrest warrant for Dirlewanger in response to his unit's anti-partisan operations, the SS-HA chief intervened with Himmler saying, "Better to shoot two Poles too many than one too few. A savage country cannot be governed in a decent manner."

==== Baltic Legions ====
Within a few weeks of the invasion of the Soviet Union, Berger's teams had begun recruiting Baltic volunteers for SS police units, forming several security battalions of Latvian and Estonian volunteers. The Wehrmacht also recruited eight Estonian battalions. This split approach to recruiting in the Baltic region continued into 1942, with some units being decimated in front line fighting. In May of that year, Berger decided to exploit the nationalists within the Baltic states in order to gain access to recruits for the Waffen-SS.

Himmler was lukewarm on his initial proposal, but as casualties started to mount in 1942, he changed his mind, and approved the formation of a Waffen-SS Estonian Legion. Despite initial misgivings, Berger also proposed the formation of a Latvian Legion, which was approved at the end of 1942.

==== Further Volksdeutsche recruiting ====
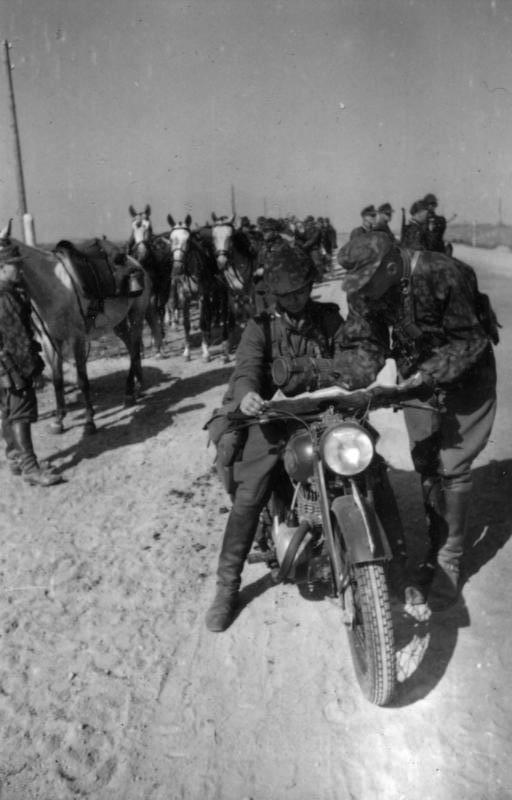
In late 1942, the SS Cavalry Brigade was used as the cadre for the SS Cavalry Division

In the meantime, the Waffen-SS had suffered over 43,000 casualties up to February 1942, particularly in the Battle of Moscow, and Berger had to replace them. Berger next turned his attention to the Hungarian Volksdeutsche. Through an agreement with the Royal Hungarian Army, his recruiters enlisted more than 16,500 ethnic German recruits from Hungary between March and May 1942. While this campaign was ongoing, on 20 April 1942 Berger was promoted to SS-Gruppenführer.

At this point, he saw a significant difference between SS ideological leadership and the martial indoctrination conducted by the German Army. In September 1942, the SS-FHA complained bitterly about Berger's recruiters, stating that many of the recruits were medically unsuitable, had been coerced or duped into enlisting, or were in fact ethnic Hungarians. Late in 1942, more Volksdeutsche from the Banat and Romania were combined with the SS Cavalry Brigade to form the SS-Kavallerie-Division. On 24 November 1942, the Chief of the Gestapo, Heinrich Müller advised Himmler of a proposal he had received from Berger that a Hungarian SS division could be financed by selling emigration permits to Slovak Jews.

==== The "national legions" ====
The "national legions" were attached to the Waffen-SS, and fought on the Eastern Front in 1942 and early 1943. Unable to replace their losses, most of the survivors were incorporated into SS-Panzergrenadierdivision Nordland, authorised by Hitler at the end of 1942. The three regiments of the new division were formed using survivors of the Freikorps Danemark, Legion Niederlande and Legion Norwegen, supplemented by transfers from SS-Division Wiking, new recruits from the occupied West European countries, and Reich Germans. Legion Flandern was broken up and used as replacements in a number of Waffen-SS formations.

While Weale states that they were mainly motivated by anti-communism, the historian George C. Stein observes that few of the "national legion" recruits were motivated by "political or ideological idealism", but were instead motivated by such factors as a desire for adventure, better food, the prestige of the uniform, and personal circumstances. According to Stein, Berger had no illusions about the motives of his West European recruits, but paid mere lip service to the idea that they joined the "anti-communist" cause out of idealism. Around 25,000 Dutch, 5,000 Danish and 3,900 Norwegian men served in the Waffen-SS. However, by mid-1942 onwards, the Waffen-SS faced increasing difficulties with these "Germanic" recruits, especially due to the policy of integrating them into "pan-Germanic" formations such as SS-Division Wiking.

For example, Norwegian recruits began requesting their release from duty, and at the beginning of 1943, nearly the entire Finnish battalion of that division asked to be released from their service obligations.

=== 1943 ===
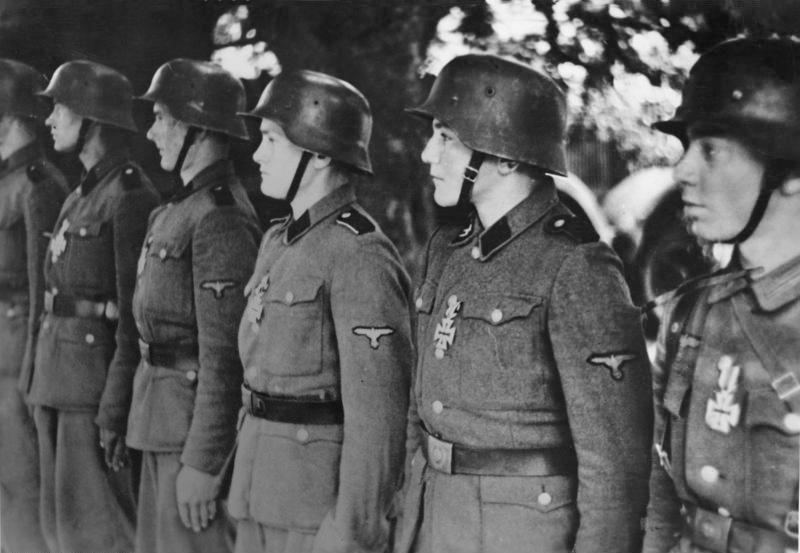
Young soldiers of the SS Division Hitlerjugend receiving the Iron Cross

In November 1942, orders were issued for the conversion of LSSAH, Das Reich and Totenkopf into panzergrenadier divisions, and the following month, Hitler ordered the formation of two more panzergrenadier divisions, the first new Waffen-SS divisions to be raised from Reich Germans since 1940. These were named Hohenstaufen and Frundsberg.

From the time that he had taken over as chief of the SS-HA, Berger had made considerable efforts to increase the amount of ideological training received by Waffen-SS personnel. In February 1943, in the wake of the German losses at Stalingrad, Berger again told Himmler that the SS needed stronger ideological training. As a result, the SS-HA issued a series of pamphlets on racial ideology, including Der Untermensch (The Sub-Human), which described certain peoples as spiritually and mentally lower than animals. Himmler and Berger also hosted representatives from the Wehrmacht who were keen to learn from SS expertise in ideological indoctrination. On 13 February, following an approach from Reichsjugendführer (German Youth Leader) Artur Axmann for a Waffen-SS division to be raised from the Hitler Youth, Berger and Axmann were told the idea had been approved by Hitler and that they could commence planning. Berger implored Himmler to appoint him as the commander of this new division, but the Reichsfuhrer demurred, telling Berger not to be impatient. Also in February, Berger complained to Himmler that the dispersal of "Germanic" volunteers throughout the Waffen-SS was having significant negative effects on the recruiting of replacements in the occupied countries. In March 1943, Wiking was also upgraded to a panzergrenadier division.

In April, losses at Stalingrad and in Tunisia allowed Berger to recruit from foreign workers in the Reich, over the objections of Reichsminister Albert Speer, the Minister for Armaments and War Production. By August, he had recruited 8,105 of these labourers, and 3,154 had already completed selection for the Waffen-SS. In June, Berger was promoted to SS-Obergruppenführer und General der Waffen-SS, and later the same month the new division, 12th SS Panzergrenadier Division Hitlerjugend was officially activated.

On 5 July 1943, Berger was awarded the German Cross in silver. By the end of 1942, the "Germanic" SS had been integrated into the wider Allgemeine-SS, and Berger drew up a badge to reward sporting prowess, skills highly prized among SS members. The result was the Germanic Proficiency Runes, which Himmler approved on 1 August 1943, although it is believed fewer than 200 were actually awarded. In August 1943, Berger was appointed to a seat in the Reichstag from electoral constituency 22, Düsseldorf East. He succeeded Oswald Pohl and retained the seat until the fall of the Nazi regime in May 1945.

In November 1943, when German-installed Latvian authorities threatened to resign over conscription, Berger suggested they be sent to a concentration camp. By the end of 1943, the former "national legions" had been significantly expanded. The Dutch regiment of SS-Panzergrenadierdivision Nordland was used to form an independent SS-Panzergrenadierbrigade Nederland, and a revamped Flemish contingent was assembled into the SS-Freiwilligen-Sturmbrigade Langemarck. The Wehrmacht also gave up its French volunteer regiment and the Wallonian Legion, which became the SS-Freiwilligen-Sturmbrigade France and SS-Freiwilligen-Sturmbrigade Wallonien. By the end of the war, all of these formations had been given divisional status in the Waffen-SS, despite the fact that they never grew to more than brigade strength. In relation to these recruits, Berger cynically observed, "For every foreign-born soldier who dies, no German mother weeps". By August 1943, the crisis in the "Germanic" project was obvious, with Berger observing that "we have come to the end of our tether in the Germanic countries".

The complaints from the SS-FHA about the quality of Volksdeutsche recruits had no effect on Berger's approach. He concluded further agreements with Hungary and Romania, and imposed on the puppet regimes of the Independent State of Croatia and the Slovak State, to effectively authorise the unrestricted conscription of ethnic Germans in those territories. In the German-occupied territory of Serbia, the General Government (annexed Poland) and parts of the Soviet Union, ethnic Germans were conscripted into the Waffen-SS in the same arbitrary manner Reich Germans were conscripted by the Wehrmacht. By the end of 1943, a quarter of the strength of the Waffen-SS was made up of Volksdeutsche.

==== The Baltic divisions ====
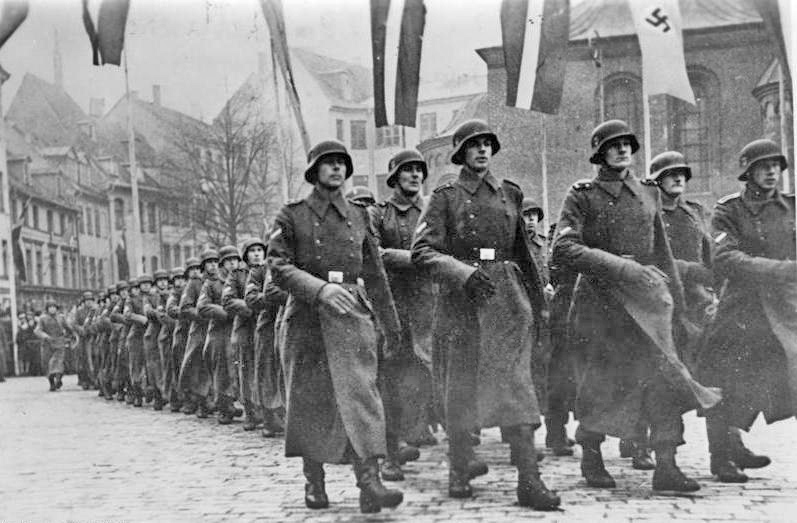
The Latvian Legion on the march in late 1943

Before either Baltic legion could complete training, these developments were overtaken by heavy casualties suffered by the West European legions on the Eastern Front, and like the West European legions, it was decided to combine the Baltic legions into larger formations. This resulted in the Estnische SS-Freiwilligen Brigade, consisting of the Estonian Legion and elements of the 1st SS Infantry Brigade, and the Lettische SS-Freiwilligen Brigade, formed around the Latvian Legion and parts of the 2nd SS Infantry Brigade. The origins of many of the men of the two SS infantry brigades was Reich German or Volksdeutsche, so these two formations were never purely Baltic. Not long after the two new volunteer brigades had been formed and committed to battle, they were upgraded to divisional status, and a third Baltic division was authorised, using the manpower of the Latvian security battalions.

To man and maintain these three new divisions, Himmler ordered the conscription of Estonian and Latvian men, and made all former Estonian Army officers and non-commissioned officers liable for service. By 1944, the Waffen-SS included the three divisions, namely; the 15th Waffen Grenadier Division of the SS (1st Latvian), the 19th Waffen Grenadier Division of the SS (2nd Latvian), and the 20th Waffen Grenadier Division of the SS (1st Estonian). The two Latvian divisions were later combined into the VI SS Army Corps (Latvian), and all three divisions fought the Soviet Red Army in defence of their homelands during 1944, and were encircled there or destroyed in subsequent fighting elsewhere.

==== The Balkan Muslim divisions ====
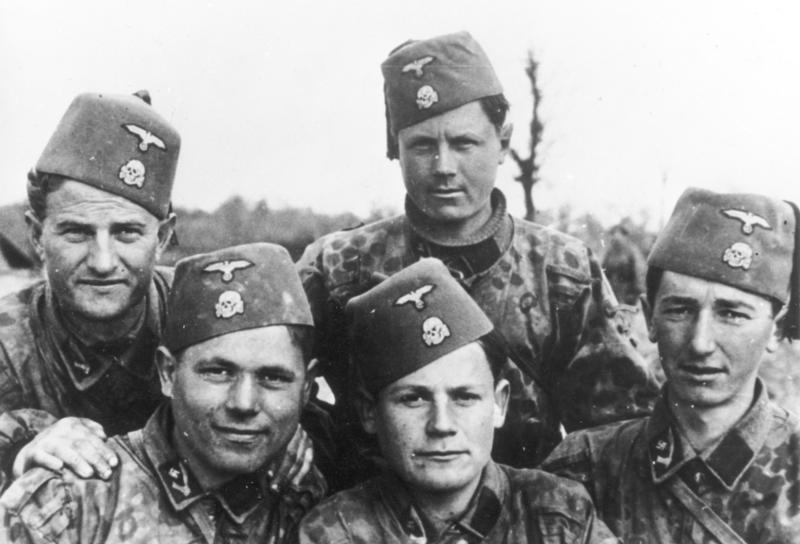
Berger assisted in the recruitment of Bosnian Muslims for the SS Division Handschar in 1943.

By February 1943, Himmler's ideals of Waffen-SS racial purity had been significantly diluted. The first division to be raised by Berger's recruiters that was clearly outside the Waffen-SS racial and ethnic strictures used manpower from the Muslim community of Bosnia. The 13th Waffen Mountain Division of the SS Handschar (1st Croatian) first went into action in February 1944, and was of limited value, especially outside of its area of operations in eastern Bosnia. While it achieved successes and proved itself competent in counter-insurgency operations against the Partisans in eastern Bosnia, the division earned a reputation for brutality and savagery, not only during combat operations, but also through atrocities committed against Serb and Jewish civilians in the security zone. Its reprisal attacks in northern and eastern Bosnia left many hundreds and possibly as many as several thousand Serb civilians dead by the spring and summer of 1944.

During 1944, two more Muslim divisions were raised, the 21st Waffen Mountain Division of the SS Skanderbeg (1st Albanian) made up Kosovar Albanians, and the 23rd Waffen Mountain Division of the SS Kama (2nd Croatian), also made up of Bosnian Muslims. Neither of these divisions were of significant combat value, and all three Muslim divisions were dissolved before the end of 1944.

==== A Ukrainian SS division ====
At the same time as the Balkan Muslim experiment, divisions were raised from Ukrainian, Russian and Hungarian men, demonstrating that racial exclusivity was no longer an entry requirement for the Waffen-SS. In April 1943, a recruiting campaign began among Ukrainians living in that part of General Government (Polish) territory that had been in Austrian Galicia prior to 1919. These Ukrainian nationalists had been referred to by Himmler as "sub-human" only a matter of months before. The resulting division was the 14th Waffen Grenadier Division of the SS (1st Galician). After a brief period of desperate fighting in mid-1944 during the Soviet Lvov–Sandomierz Offensive, only 3,000 escaped encirclement and destruction from an original strength of 14,000. The division's combat performance was poor, and it never saw action again.

=== 1944 ===
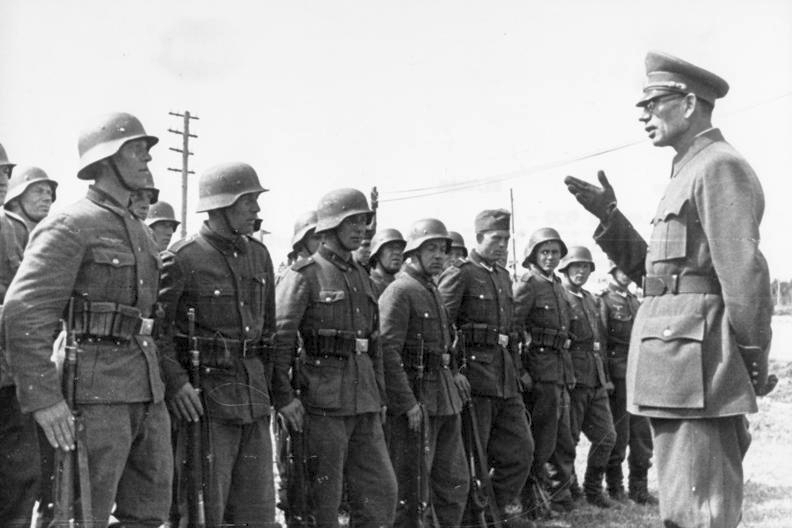
The soldiers of the 29th Waffen Grenadier Division of the SS were handed over to the Russian Liberation Army of Andrey Vlasov

In early 1944, the SS directed the governments of Hungary and the Slovak State to transfer to the Waffen-SS all the Volksdeutsche serving in their armed forces. This amounted to another 50,000 troops. During 1944, Berger gave a speech in which he advocated a "Germanic Reich" that included all the countries that had Germanic or Nordic populations. He said, "Since the Schutzstaffel was taken over by the Reichsführer-SS in 1929, its long-term goal has been the Germanic Reich. This long-term goal inevitably forms part of the SS claim to be a formation of Nordic men. It cannot be stopped by artificially drawn boundaries". He was also concerned that the SS was losing its previous dominance in ideological matters, as the Wehrmacht had largely adopted the ideological maxims of the SS. This narrowing of the ideological gap between the Waffen-SS and the Army was of considerable concern to SS leaders such as Berger, as it undermined the legitimacy of the SS as the leaders of the Nazi project. The Galician approach was repeated in mid-1944 in the face of mounting casualties from Soviet offensives. Security units manned by Russians and Ukrainians were combined to form two more divisions, the 29th Waffen Grenadier Division of the SS (1st Russian) and 30th Waffen Grenadier Division of the SS (2nd Russian). Neither reached more than regimental size. The first division was handed over to the Russian Liberation Army of Andrey Vlasov before it saw combat, and the second saw action on the Western Front in late 1944 before being reconstituted as a "White Ruthenian" brigade in March 1945. It too saw no further action.

In the period from late 1944, more Eastern European formations were hurriedly raised by Berger's recruiters or converted from existing smaller units. These included the 25th Waffen Grenadier Division of the SS Hunyadi (1st Hungarian), 26th Waffen Grenadier Division of the SS (2nd Hungarian), 31st SS Volunteer Grenadier Division, and a number of smaller formations of brigade and regimental size. Several Cossack units were also transferred from the Wehrmacht; the 1st Cossack Cavalry Division was formally transferred to the Waffen-SS as the basis for the XV SS Cossack Cavalry Corps. Even the Sonderkommando Dirlewanger was increased in size, taking on Soviet prisoner of war to boost its numbers.

== Other wartime activities ==
=== Eastern Territories ===
In July 1942, Berger was appointed as Himmler's liaison officer with the Reichsminister for the Occupied Eastern Territories, Alfred Rosenberg. To bolster his position with Himmler, Rosenberg was even willing to appoint Berger as his second state secretary, but Hitler would not allow it. On 10 August 1943, Berger convinced Rosenberg to appoint him as the Chief of Political Operations in the Occupied Eastern Territories. Himmler had long wanted such responsibilities to be placed in SS hands, and this appointment meant that Berger could sabotage any resistance to SS domination of the economy and population of the subjugated east. The appointment took effect on 10 August 1943, and lasted until January 1945.

In this role, Berger proposed a plan to kidnap and enslave 50,000 Eastern European children between the ages of 10 and 14, under the codename Heuaktion. On 14 June 1944, Rosenberg issued orders implementing Berger's idea.

=== Prisoners of war ===
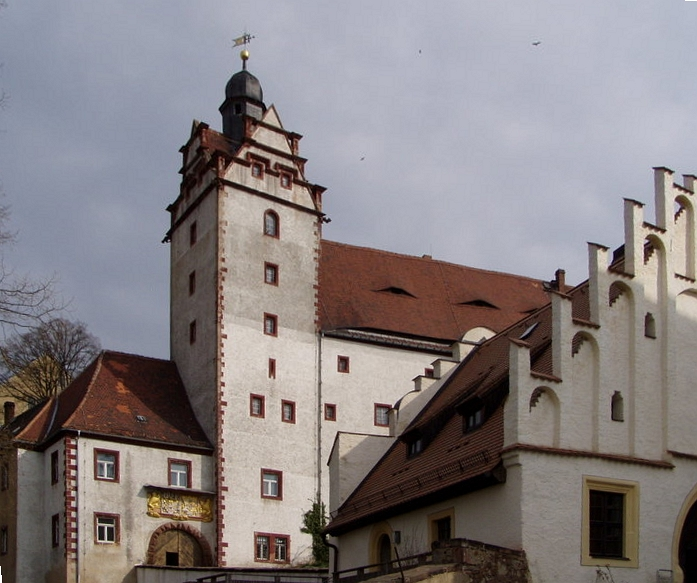
Colditz Castle, where the Prominente were kept until transported south and handed over to the Americans on Berger's orders

On 20 July 1944, the responsibility for administration of German prisoner of war (POW) camps was transferred to Berger. This followed the failed attempt on Hitler's life earlier that month, when the Führer turned to his "faithful Heinrich" to head the Replacement Army, and the SS chief quickly delegated the responsibility to Berger. By September, the responsibility had been formally transferred to Himmler, but Berger did not act to integrate his new responsibilities into the SS bureaucracy. Instead, he allowed the camps to continue as they were, with the same staff and procedures.

After the war, Berger claimed that he had made various efforts to ameliorate the situation of Allied POWs. Authors John Nichol and Tony Rennell observed that none of these claims have ever been independently verified, but some testimony has disputed Berger's claims. They concluded that most, if not all, of Berger's claims about his actions to assist POWs are "unbelievable", and noted that he did not raise any of these claims during his trial at Nuremberg after the war, or even in his autobiography. One of the few claims that has been verified to some extent is his work to protect the Prominente, a group of high-ranking or otherwise important POWs that had been held at Colditz Castle until 13 April 1945. There were a total of 21 Prominente, including Viscount Lascelles and the Master of Elphinstone, both nephews of King George VI, and Giles Romilly, a nephew of the British Prime Minister Winston Churchill. Berger arranged for them to be evacuated from Colditz and transported south and handed over to advancing U.S. Army troops. In doing so, Berger disobeyed a direct order from Hitler for them to be executed. This action later contributed to the shortening of his prison sentence for war crimes.

=== Slovak uprising ===
On 23 August 1944, an uprising broke out against the German puppet government in the Slovak State. The revolt was centred on Banská Bystrica high in the Low Tatra mountains. The rebellion was led by several former members of the Government, and included elements of the Slovak Army and some British-trained parachutists. The uprising was relying on a rapid advance of the Red Army into the Slovak State. Despite the fact that the Soviet armies were just over 160 kilometres (100 mi) away at the time the revolt began, they did not reach the rebels in time. On 31 August, Berger was appointed Military Commander in Slovakia, and held sway for the next three weeks. His tasks were to disarm the Slovak Army, ensure lines of communication to the Eastern Front and restore order. He was also to work with the right-wing Hlinka Guard to establish a new armed force in the puppet state.

A new Slovak government was established under the leadership of Štefan Tiso. Berger's initial force consisted of several ad hoc kampfgruppen (combat groups) totalling 10,000 men, against a rebel army of some 47,000. On 9 September, Himmler advised Berger that he had been awarded the Iron Cross Second Class for his work in Slovakia. By mid-September, the uprising had yet to be quelled, and the only regions that had been pacified were western Slovakia and the Váh valley, although the rebels had been encircled. Due to Berger's lack of success, Himmler replaced him with a HSSPF, Hermann Höfle, and Berger relinquished the role of Military Commander in Slovakia on 19 September. Höfle then bloodily suppressed the revolt with the assistance of additional troops that arrived in late October. Berger was then appointed to organise the Volkssturm (Home Guard) in Germany.

=== Volkssturm chief of staff ===
As Germany's situation deteriorated, Hitler decided to form the Volkssturm, a Nazi Party local militia to defend communities within the Reich. On 24 September 1944, Hitler appointed his private secretary and head of the Party Chancellery, Reichsleiter Martin Bormann to form the Volkssturm. Himmler was given responsibility for the military organisation and equipment of the new militia, which he delegated to Berger, who became one of two chiefs of staff for the organisation. Bormann resisted Berger's attempts to take over the Volkssturm, and it remained largely under Bormann's control, with local recruiting conducted by the Gauleiters.

=== Field command ===
In the last few months of the war, the Western Allies became concerned that Hitler would concentrate his remaining forces in a redoubt in the Alps. While this idea was more along the lines of a potential refuge from the Russians rather than a fortress, fears of the existence of an "Alpine Fortress" resulted in the diversion of strong forces towards the southern parts of the Reich to forestall such a plan. In fact, at a surrender ceremony on 5 May, German General der Infanterie Hermann Foertsch astonished General Jacob L. Devers, commander of the Sixth United States Army Group, when he told him that as many as 350,000 German troops were still cut off in the Alps. Berger commanded a Kampfgruppe of remnants of the XIII SS Army Corps, including fragments of the 17th SS Panzergrenadier Division Götz von Berlichingen, 35th SS and Police Grenadier Division, and the 2nd Mountain Division.

Berger intended to surrender separately to American forces, and after two days delay, managed to locate a regimental commander of the 101st Airborne Division near Berchtesgaden south of Salzburg. On the following day, Berger was arrested.

== Assessments ==
Berger has been described as "blustery", cynical, and "one of Himmler's most competent and ruthless war-time lieutenants". An ardent antisemite, he was also a proponent of the Final Solution. The historian Gerhard Rempel described him as a skilled bureaucratic manipulator, who was "unscrupulous, blunt, and inelegant in manner and expression, yet also full of genial loquacity and racy humour". Despite his own unassailable position at the head of the SS, Himmler was often distracted by Berger's gossip and subterfuge against other leaders within the SS.

Within the SS, Berger was known as one of Himmler's "Twelve Apostles", and was nicknamed "der Allmächtige Gottlob" ("the Almighty Gottlob", a play on "The Almighty God", as "Gott" is the German word for "God"). He was also referred to by the phrase "Praise God" and another nickname was "The Duke of Swabia", reflecting his Swabian origins.

Ultimately, Berger was responsible for the large numbers of non-Reich foreign recruits that joined the Waffen-SS between 1940 and 1945. Despite the fact that Berger would have preferred a field command, he was one of Himmler's few trusted senior lieutenants, and his recruiting and organisational skills meant he was kept as chief of the SS-HA throughout the war. The only exception was the short period as military commander in the Slovak State in the autumn of 1944 during the uprising. In September 1939, the number of non-Germans in what soon became the Waffen-SS was minimal. By May 1945, the force included 38 divisions, and the majority were non-Germans. None of the 38 divisions were exclusively manned by Reich Germans, and half were mostly made up of personnel from outside the Reich.

The post-war Nuremberg trials made the declaratory judgement that the Waffen-SS was a criminal organisation due to its major involvement in war crimes and crimes against humanity, including the killing of prisoners-of-war and atrocities committed in occupied countries. Excluded from this judgement were those who were conscripted into the Waffen-SS and had not personally committed war crimes and crimes against humanity.

== War crimes trial ==
After his arrest in May 1945, Berger remained in Allied custody pending a trial before a US military tribunal for various war crimes. He was initially to be a defendant in the proposed "Prisoners of War" Trial, but was eventually included in what became known as the Ministries Trial of the subsequent Nuremberg trials. The final indictment against Berger and his co-defendants was lodged on 18 November 1947; the trial commenced on 6 January 1948, before Judges William C. Christianson (presiding), Maguire and Leon W. Powers, and ended on 13 April 1949.

=== Indictment ===
Eight counts formed the indictment against Berger:

1. Crimes against peace
2. Common plan and conspiracy
3. War crimes, murder, and ill-treatment of belligerents and POWs, including the murder of French Général de division Gustave Mesny, a POW who was killed in reprisal for the death of Generalleutnant Fritz von Brodowski at the hands of the French resistance in October 1944 while Berger was chief of the POW camps
4. This count was stricken during the trial
5. War crimes and crimes against humanity, atrocities and offences committed against civilian populations
6. Plunder and spoliation
7. Slave labour
8. Membership in criminal organisations

=== Berger's evidence ===
During his trial, Berger claimed that he had not been aware of the Final Solution until after the war, but the prosecution produced evidence that he had been present at the first of Himmler's infamous 1943 Posen speeches in which the Reichsfuhrer-SS had explicitly spoken of the extermination of Jews. Berger's defence counsel claimed that his client did not believe the word "extermination" had been used by Himmler with regard to Jews during the speech. Berger's lawyer went on in an attempt to mitigate Berger's actions by claiming that the Cold War bore strong parallels to the Nazi fight against "Jews and Bolsheviks", and the possibility that the US would also have to fight the Soviet Union in the near future. During the war, Berger wrote in an article, "We the National Socialists believe the Fuhrer when he says that the annihilation of Jewry in Europe stands at the end of the fight instigated by the Jewish World Parasite against us as his strongest enemy." Berger and others also claimed that the unit commanded by Dirlewanger was not part of the SS, although when the text of Himmler's second Posen speech was uncovered in 1953, it "cast dubious light" on Berger's claim. He displayed no remorse for his actions.

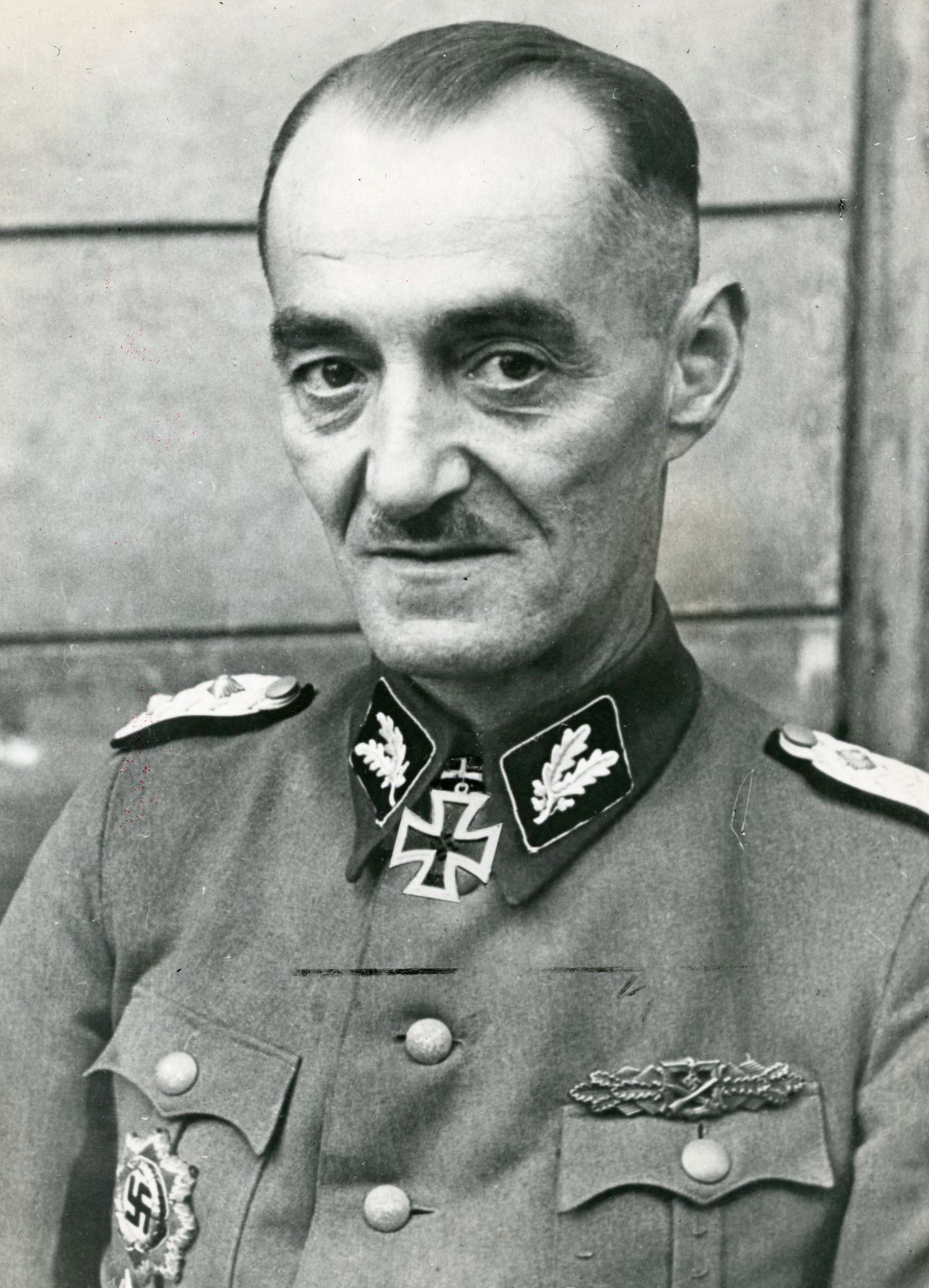
Berger's friend Oskar Dirlewanger commanded the eponymous SS-Sonderkommando from its inception.

The majority of the tribunal declared that "it seems impossible to believe Berger's testimony that he knew nothing of the plans to destroy the Jews or that he never heard of the "final solution" until after the war." However, the court accepted his claim that he saved the lives of Allied POWs whose safety was gravely imperiled by Hitler's orders that they be shot or held as hostages. The court determined that Berger had disobeyed orders and placed himself in danger in order to intervene on behalf of the POWs in question. In contrast, Berger was found guilty of transporting Hungarian Jews to concentration camps and recruiting concentration camp guards. Berger also stated in his evidence that he considered Himmler "an unassimilated half-breed and unfit for the SS".

=== Judgement ===
Berger was acquitted under counts one, and two, and some parts of counts three, and five, and was also acquitted under count six. He was convicted under that part of count three relating to the murder of Mesny, and under those parts of count five relating to his involvement with the SS-Sonderkommando Dirlewanger, for being a conscious participant in the concentration camp program, and the conscription of nationals of other countries.

He was also convicted under that part of count seven relating to the children and youth slave labour program, including the Heuaktion, and was also convicted under count eight. Judge Powers handed down a dissenting opinion, stating that he was of the view that Berger was not responsible for the murder of Mesny.

=== Sentence and review ===
On the counts under which he was convicted, Berger was sentenced to 25 years imprisonment, but received credit for the nearly four years during which he had been in custody awaiting trial. Peter Maguire observes that given the status of the defendants and the body of evidence against them, the sentences given to all those indicted in the Ministries Trial were light.

The sentences were reviewed by an advisory board for Clemency for War Criminals, which was responsible for providing advice to the U.S. High Commissioner for Germany John J. McCloy. On 31 January 1951, McCloy determined to reduce Berger's sentence to 10 years imprisonment, stating that he appeared to have been unjustly convicted for the murder of Mesny, and that McCloy had given greater weight to Berger's active interventions "to save the lives of Allied officers and men who under Hitler orders were held for liquidation or as hostages". McCloy did not explain why Berger could not be held responsible for the murder of Mesny, despite the majority finding of the tribunal that Berger bore "command responsibility" for the murder. Berger was released from Landsberg prison in December 1951, having spent a total of six and a half years in custody.

== After release ==
After his release from prison in 1951, Berger worked in Stuttgart and Böblingen in his native Baden-Württemberg, and managed a curtain rail factory. He also contributed articles to the monthly right-wing journal Nation Europa published in Coburg, and occasionally wrote articles encouraging NATO to give greater consideration to former members of the Waffen-SS. He and his wife Christine had four children: Krista, Wolf, Helgart and Folkart. He died on 5 January 1975 in Gerstetten.

== Awards ==
Berger received the following awards and medals during his life:

- Iron Cross Second Class and Sturmmedaille Ypern – 26 November 1914
- Württemberg Military Merit Medal in Gold – 21 May 1915
- Knight's Cross of the Württemberg Military Order of Merit – 5 April 1918
- Wound Badge in Silver – 18 June 1918
- Iron Cross First Class and Knight's Cross First Class of the Friedrich Order with Swords – 11 August 1918
- Honour Cross with Swords
- SA Sports Badge in Gold – 15 December 1934
- Sword of Honour of the Reichsführer-SS and SS Honour Ring – 1936
- German Olympic Decoration First Class – 16 August 1936
- Sudetenland Medal with "Prague Castle" Bar
- Memel Medal
- Nazi Party Long Service Award in Silver and Bronze
- Social Welfare Decoration Second Class
- War Merit Cross Second Class with Swords – 11 January 1939
- War Merit Cross First Class with Swords – 1 July 1940
- Order of the Cross of Liberty First Class with Swords (Finland) – 10 September 1941
- Military Virtue Medal (Romania) – 5 June 1942
- First Class Commander of the Order of the White Rose of Finland with Jewels and Swords – 26 August 1942
- Grand Cross of the Order of the Holy Crown of Hungary with Swords and War Decoration – 1 October 1942
- Golden Party Badge – 30 January 1943
- German Cross in Silver – 1 July 1943
- Grand Cross of the Order of the Crown of King Zvonimir with Swords and Star (giving the title of vitez (knight) – 7 December 1943)
- Hitler Youth Badge in Gold – 30 January 1944
- 1939 Clasp to the Iron Cross Second Class, 15 September 1944
- 1939 clasp to the Iron Cross First Class – 18 September 1944
- Slovak War Victory Cross First Class – 20 September 1944
- Knight's Cross of the War Merit Cross with Swords – 26 September 1944

== See also ==
- Glossary of Nazi Germany
- List of Nazi Party leaders and officials
- List of SS-Obergruppenführers
- SS-Heimatschutz Slowakei
