= Gustave Mesny =

French Army general

Gustave Marie Maurice Mesny
- Born: 28 March 1886; Le Puy-en-Velay, Haute-Loire, France
- Died: 19 January 1945 (aged 58) near Nossen, Nazi Germany
- Military career
- Allegiance: France
- Branch: French Army
- Service years: –1945
- Rank: Divisional general (Major General)
- Commands: 5th North African Infantry Division
- Conflicts: Second World War (executed): Western Front; French and Low Countries campaign; Battle of France; Siege of Lille (1940) (POW)

Gustave Marie Maurice Mesny (28 March 1886 – 19 January 1945) was a French Army general in command of the 5th North African Infantry Division who was captured by Wehrmacht soldiers during the Battle of France in June 1940, during the Second World War. He was victim of a war crime, controversially killed by Nazi Germany in retribution for the death of German General Fritz von Brodowski while in French custody.

== Military career ==
Mesny was a member of the military command of the eleventh region until 1939. Then, in 1940, he commanded the 5th North African Infantry Division. His unit was surrounded in the Siege of Lille, and he fought with the group of General Jean-Baptiste Molinié until 31 May 1940 at Haubourdin. Mesny was taken prisoner and interned in the Königstein Fortress. Mesny was involved in the escape of General Henri Giraud in April 1942.

On 28 October 1944, German General Fritz von Brodowski was shot and killed under suspicious circumstances after he was taken prisoner by the French. On 8 and 9 November, Swiss and British media announced that the Wehrmacht general who, according to the same journalists, had participated in the Oradour-sur-Glane massacre (643 civilians executed by the 2nd SS Panzer Division Das Reich) had been shot. The German High Command concluded, without due process, that the general died in revenge for Oradour. In return the command asked Adolf Hitler to avenge the death of Brodowski.

Hitler ordered Wilhelm Keitel to send a list of French generals imprisoned at Königstein. General René-Jacques Mortemart de Boisse was then chosen by Hitler to be executed in retribution. The case then fell to three jurisdictions: the Reichssicherheitshauptamt (RSHA), the German Foreign Office (Auswärtiges Amt and the chief of the Kriegsgefangenenwesen (KGW, administration of prisoners of war). Details were planned by the chief of SS Main Office Gottlob Berger and Colonel Friedrich Meurer, inspector general assigned to prisoners of war. With the large number of authorities involved no longer ensuring the secrecy surrounding the execution of General de Boisse, Meurer arbitrarily picked Mesny.

The execution was carried out on 19 January 1945 by two members of the SS. For the occasion, they wore Wehrmacht uniforms. Mesny and other generals were officially transferred to Oflag IV-C in Colditz Castle. During the transfer, a fictitious car crash separated Mesny from the rest of the group. He was then shot in the neck with a bullet near Nossen.

Mesny was wearing his uniform and did not want to escape in January 1945 because it was almost the end of the war and he was afraid his son, who was a member of the French Resistance and deportee in a German concentration camp, would be executed (written testimony of General Louis Buisson, a prisoner of war with Mesny, on 29 April 1945 for the Nuremberg Tribunal).

== Promotions ==
Mesny's Ranks
Date	Rank
25 December 1937	Colonel
1 June 1940	Temporary Brigadier-General
1 September 1940	Reverted to Colonel
20 May 1941	Conditional Brigadier-General
10 August 1944	Brigadier-General (Dated back to 20 May 1941)
10 August 1944	Major-General (Dated back to 20 November 1942)

== See also ==
- Geneva Convention on Prisoners of War
