= 14th Zouave Regiment =

French Army zouave regiment formed in 1939

- 14e régiment de zouaves
- Active: September 1939 – June 1940
- Country: France
- Branch: French Army
- Type: Regiment of zouaves
- Role: Infantry
- Size: About 3,500 men in 1939
- Part of: 5th North African Infantry Division
- Garrison/HQ: Lyon
- Mottos: Combattre pour sauver ce qui peut être sauvé et, avant tout, l'honneur des drapeaux Fight to save what can be saved and, above all, the honour of the flags
- Engagements: Second World War; Battle of France; Lille pocket
- Battle honours: None

Commanders
- Commanding officer: Lieutenant-Colonel Galtier

The 14th Zouave Regiment (French: 14e régiment de zouaves, abbreviated 14e RZ) was a short-lived regiment of zouaves of the French Army. It was created in September 1939, at the beginning of the Second World War, and was destroyed during the Battle of France in May 1940.

The regiment formed part of the 5th North African Infantry Division, a French formation created in September 1939 and dissolved after the German victory in France in June 1940. During the fighting in northern France, the 14th Zouave Regiment took part in the defensive operations around Namur, Charleroi, Mons, Seclin and Haubourdin, before surrendering after the fighting of the Lille pocket.

== Creation ==
The 14th Zouave Regiment was created in September 1939 in Lyon and attached to Depot 142. On 9 September 1939, the regiment departed by train from Lyon Saint-Clair station towards Lorraine.

The regiment was formed from active officers as well as reserve officers. Many of the reserve cadres came from Lyon, Auvergne, Savoy and, for some, Provence. The regiment joined the 5th North African Infantry Division at the beginning of September 1939.

== Motto and insignia ==
The motto of the regiment was:

Combattre pour sauver ce qui peut être sauvé et, avant tout, l'honneur des drapeaux

In English:

Fight to save what can be saved and, above all, the honour of the flags.

The badge of the 14th Zouave Regiment was created during the regiment's stay in Lorraine. It was selected from several proposed designs. The crescent recalled the regiment's attachment to a major North African formation. The jackal was a traditional symbol of the zouaves, while the Cross of Lorraine referred to the fact that the founding cadres came from units stationed in that old French province.

== Commanding officer ==
- Lieutenant-Colonel Galtier

== Structure ==
The regiment was organised into three battalions:

- 1st Battalion, Commandant Rognon
  - 1st Company, Captain Jaeger
  - 2nd Company, Lieutenant Blanc
- 2nd Battalion, Commandant Mathieu
- 3rd Battalion, Commandant Pelletier

== History ==
=== Deployment in 1939 and 1940 ===
About 3,500 men left Lyon in autumn 1939 from the former Saint-Clair station. From Lorraine, where the regiment arrived by train, it moved towards Germany for brief encounters with the enemy during the period of the Phoney War.

From 16 January 1940, the regiment moved to Lorraine, around Creutzwald, then, in severe winter conditions, to the region of Avesnes-sur-Helpe and Vermand. It later reached Sains-du-Nord, where it remained until 10 May 1940.

At dawn on 10 May, the regiment received an alert message indicating that German forces had entered Belgium and that French forces were moving to meet them. The 14th Zouave Regiment advanced into Belgium by night marches, in order to reduce exposure to German aircraft, and reached the area forward of Namur.

=== Battle of France ===
The expected German assault did not immediately fall on the regiment. On 16 May, the order to retreat towards Charleroi was received. During this withdrawal, the regiment clashed with a German motorcycle formation. The French account also mentions the activity of so-called "fifth column" elements firing on French soldiers from behind.

The regiment withdrew through Belgium in successive stages, marching at night and fighting during the day. It fought around Namur, Charleroi and Mons, helping to cover the withdrawal of larger French forces.

The 5th North African Infantry Division crossed back into France on 20 May, by which time German forces had already reached the sea. The 14th Zouave Regiment became isolated from other French forces and was surrounded.

On 24 May, the regiment was attacked by Stuka dive-bombers and suffered losses. At dawn on 25 May, it was hit by accurate and deadly German artillery fire. The regiment then moved northwards, fighting step by step along the Ferin Canal, south of Douai. It held back the German advance for two days.

On 27 May, the 3rd Battalion resisted German attacks on the eastern flank of the pocket, while the 1st and 2nd Battalions attacked westwards in an attempt to open a passage. The attempt failed and German reinforcements continued to arrive. The 14th Zouave Regiment was unable to reach the sea.

On 28 May, the 3rd Battalion was attacked at Seclin and was forced to lay down its arms on 29 May. The 1st and 2nd Battalions reached Haubourdin.

=== Fighting at Haubourdin ===
At Haubourdin, from 29 to the evening of 31 May, the remnants of the 14th Zouave Regiment fought in street combat. According to French accounts, the regiment sometimes fought at odds of one against twenty, giving ground only step by step and inflicting heavy losses on the enemy. The regiment also claimed to have destroyed several tanks belonging to forces commanded by Erwin Rommel.

After several German demands for surrender, the regiment ceased fighting on the evening of 31 May. The Germans granted the defenders the honours of war. On 1 June, thirty armed soldiers representing the 14th Zouave Regiment paraded under the command of a lieutenant attached to the chief of staff of the 1st Battalion.

By the end of the day, the surviving members of the regiment were marched into captivity. Of the approximately 3,500 men who had formed the regiment in Lyon, only 368 survivors were taken prisoner after three weeks of fighting.

== Second World War battle honours ==
The regiment took part in the following campaign:

- 1940: Battle of France
  - 25–30 May 1940: Lille pocket

The regiment was effectively destroyed in three weeks of combat. According to the French regimental tradition, it had fulfilled the order given to the isolated and encircled northern armies: to fight in order to save what could still be saved and, above all, the honour of the flags.

== Regimental flag ==
The flag of the regiment bore no battle honours.
