= Heuaktion =

1944 Nazi program of kidnapping children for slave labour

- Part of Generalplan Ost and Eastern Front
- Operational scope: Kidnapping of children by Nazi Germany
- Location: Byelorussian SSR, Eastern Poland, Ukraine
- Planned by: Reich Ministry for the Occupied Eastern Territories: Alfred Rosenberg; Gottlob Berger
- Target: Slavic children (aged 10–14)
- Objective: Forced labor for Nazi Germany; Rear area security; Forced Germanization of racially selected children
- Date: June 1944 – October 1944
- Executed by: Army Group Center; 2nd Army; 4th Army; 9th Army; Army Group Center Rear Area
- Outcome: Abduction and deportation of 40,000–50,000 children to Nazi Germany

Heuaktion (or HEU-Aktion) (German: "hay harvest", or "hay operation") was a World War II operation in which 40,000 to 50,000 Belarusian, Polish and Ukrainian children aged 10 to 14 were kidnapped by German occupation forces and deported to Nazi Germany as slave labourers. The operation was executed by Army Group Center's 2nd, 4th, and the 9th Armies.

"HEU" was an acronym for "Homeless, parentless, unhoused [heimatlos, elternlos, unterkunftslos]", although many children did not fit into these categories, and the name was for propaganda purposes only. On arrival in Germany, the children were turned over to Organisation Todt and to the Junkers aircraft works. The operation was a war crime and a crime against humanity.

== Background and planning ==
Prior to the official start of the Heuaktion operation, it was already common practice for the Wehrmacht and the SS to abduct children in the course of the anti-partisan reprisals in the occupied Soviet Union. Surviving children would be sent to the Nazi concentration camps; later, they were redirected to the Ostarbeiter (slave labor) pipeline. The same practices were implemented by the Wehrmacht as it retreated across the Eastern Front in the course of the 1943 campaigns, as part of its scorched earth policies.

In July 1942, Gottlob Berger, the head of the SS Main Office, was appointed as the SS liaison officer with the Reichsminister for the Occupied Eastern Territories, Alfred Rosenberg. On 10 August 1943, Rosenberg appointed Berger as the Chief of Political Operations in the Occupied Eastern Territories. Himmler had long wanted such responsibilities to be placed in SS hands, and this appointment meant that Berger could sabotage any resistance to SS domination of the economy and population of the subjugated east.

In this role, Berger proposed a plan to kidnap and enslave 50,000 Eastern European children between the ages of 10 and 14, under the codename Heuaktion. Rosenberg originally feared that targeting children aged 10 to 14 would be seen as simple abduction, and proposed instead kidnapping older children aged 15 to 17.

== Operation ==
The on-going actions by the German 9th Army induced Rosenberg to consent to the kidnapping of younger children. On 14 June 1944, Rosenberg issued orders implementing Berger's idea. The intentions of the mass abductions were to pressure the adult populations of the occupied territories to register as workers in the Reich and to weaken the “biological strength” of the areas that Germany had invaded.

The children were transferred to special camps for children called Kindererziehungslager, where the Germans selected children whose racial traits made them suitable for Germanization. Children considered racially unsuitable were sent either to slave labor in Germany or to Nazi concentration camps, including Auschwitz, after the destruction of their birth certificates.

The children were kidnapped by Army Group Centre and by the 2nd Army, whose Chief of Staff, Henning von Tresckow, on 28 June 1944 signed the order to abduct the children. The order read in part "In operations against gangs [i.e. Bandenbekämpfung], any boys and girls taken between ages 10 and 13 who are physically healthy, and whose parents either cannot be located or who, as persons unable to work, are to be sent to the area earmarked for remaining families (the dregs are to be sent to the Reich)." The 4th the 9th Armies also kidnapped children for forced labor. The military would surround villages and comb them for children to be deported.

The operation peaked in 1944, but the kidnappings were not fully implemented due to the subsequent course of the war.

== Legal assessment ==
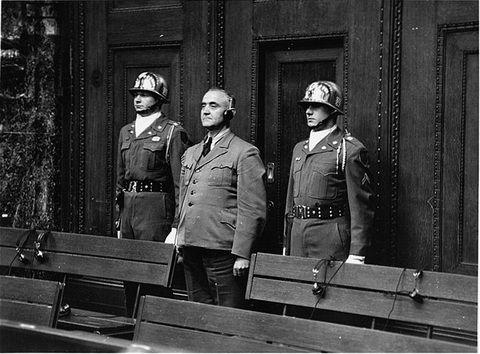
Gottlob Berger, head of the SS Main Office, in the dock at the Ministries Trial, part of the subsequent Nuremberg trials, in 1949.

The Nuremberg trials classified the kidnapping of children as part of the Nazi program of systemic genocide. The Heuaktion program was deemed a war crime and a crime against humanity. Rosenberg was convicted for his role in the operation and sentenced to death.

Berger was arrested in May 1945; he remained in Allied custody pending a trial before a US military tribunal for various crimes. He was tried at the Ministries Trial of the subsequent Nuremberg trials for war crimes and crimes against humanity. Along other charges in the indictment, he was convicted for his role in the children and youth slave labour program, including the Heuaktion.

== See also ==
- Deutsche Volksliste – Nazi program classifying inhabitants of German-occupied territory
- Lebensborn – Nazi Germany eugenics program
- War crimes of the Wehrmacht
