= XXXIV Army Corps (Wehrmacht) =

Höheres Kommando z.b.V. XXXIV XXXIV. Armeekorps
- Active: 15 October 1939 – 31 January 1942; 13 November 1944 - 8 May 1945
- Country: Nazi Germany
- Branch: Army
- Size: Corps
- Engagements: World War II: Operation Barbarossa; Battle of Kiev (1941); Battle of Moscow; Syrmian Front

Commanders
- Notable commanders: Friedrich-Wilhelm Müller; Hellmuth Felmy

German XXXIV. Corps (XXXIV. Armeekorps) was a corps in the German Army during World War II, that was formed twice.

== History ==
=== First formation : Höheres Kommando z.b.V. XXXIV (1939-1941) ===
The Corps was first known as Höheres Kommando z.b.V. XXXIV (H.Kdo.) and was established on 15 October 1939 in Küstrin. After the Invasion of Poland, the H.Kdo was stationed there between December 1939 and June 1941.

After the start of Operation Barbarossa (June 1941), the H.Kdo saw its first action at the beginning of July 1941 in the Battle of Kiev (1941). As part of the 6th Army, the H.Kdo formed part of the southern flank along the Dnieper River. After successfully completing this battle, the H.Kdo advanced with the 2nd Panzer Army towards Moscow.

The H.Kdo. marched via Livny towards Yelets, where the advance was halted. The Soviets launched their Yelets counter offensive on 6 December 1941. The XXXIV H.Kdo., composed of the 45th and 134th Infantry Divisions, was surrounded and partly destroyed. The survivors retreated towards Oryol and Kursk. The front line stabilised on December 17, 1941, but had moved almost 100 km back to the west. The H.Kdo. had lost 12,000 men and was hardly a combat-ready unit any more.

On 31 January 1942, the H.Kdo. was disbanded and its survivors added to the newly formed XXXV Army Corps.

=== Second formation : XXXIV Corps (1944-1945) ===
On 13 November 1944, the XXXIV Corps was recreated from Kommandanten Kreta a.k.a. Korps Müller, which had retreated from Crete. The Corps was stationed around Vukovar and held the Syrmian Front between Danube and Sava until mid-April 1945. On 12 April 1945, the Yugoslav First Partisan Army, broke through the XXXIV Corps' defenses in Syrmia, and captured the cities of Vukovar, Vinkovci, Županja, and finally Zagreb in the last month of the war.

The Corps retreated towards the west and surrendered to the British in May 1945.

== Commanders ==
=== Höheres Kommando XXXIV ===
- General der Infanterie Hermann Metz (15 october 1939 - 1 september 1941)
- Generalleutnant Ferdinand Schaal (1 september 1941 - 13 september 1941)
- General der Infanterie Hermann Metz (13 september 1941 - 23 december 1941)
- General der Infanterie Alfred Wäger (23 december 1941 - 31 january 1942)

=== XXXIV Corps ===
- General der Infanterie Friedrich-Wilhelm Müller, (13 November 1944 – 8 December 1944)
- General der Flieger Hellmuth Felmy, (8 December 1944 - 8 May 1945)

== Area of operations ==
- Poland : December 1939 – June 1941
- Eastern Front, central sector – July 1941 – January 1942
- Croatia : November 1944 - May 1945

== See also ==
- List of German corps in World War II

== Sources ==
- This is a translation of the article in the Dutch Wikipedia, Höheres Kommando z.b.V. XXXIV.
- This is a translation of the article in the Dutch Wikipedia, 34e Legerkorps (Wehrmacht).
- "Höheres Kommando z.b.V. XXXIV". Lexikon der Wehrmacht.
- "XXXIV. Armeekorps". Lexikon der Wehrmacht.
