= 2nd North African Infantry Division =

The 2nd North African Infantry Division (French: 2e Division d'infanterie nord-africaine, 2e DINA) was a French Army formation during World War II.

The Division was created in March 1936 and was dissolved in May 1940 following the invasion of France. The Division was commanded by Generals Fernand Lescanne (to January 1940) and Pierre Dame.

During the Battle of France in May 1940 the division was made up of the following units:

- 11 Zouaves Regiment
- 13 Algerian Tirailleurs Regiment
- 22 Algerian Tirailleurs Regiment
- 92 Reconnaissance Battalion
- 40 North African Artillery Regiment
- 240 North African Artillery Regiment

It was an active division which existed during peacetime. The Zouaves Regiments were made up from European settlers in Algeria and some recruited from France. The other regiments were made up of native troops from Algeria.
