= Siege of Lille (1940) =

Component of World War 2

- Part of the Battle of France in the Second World War
- Situation, 21 May – 4 June 1940
Date	28–31 May 1940
Location	Lille, France 50°38′0″N 3°4′0″E
Result	See Aftermath section
Territorial changes	German capture of Lille

Belligerents
France	Germany

Commanders and leaders
Jean-Baptiste Molinié (POW); Alphonse Juin (POW); Gustave Mesny (POW)	Alfred Wäger; Erwin Rommel; Joachim Lemelsen; Max von Hartlieb-Walsporn; Ludwig Ritter von Radlmeier; Fritz Kühne (POW)

Strength
Elements of 6 divisions; c. 40,000 men; 50 tanks	4 infantry divisions; 3 panzer divisions; c. 160,000 men; 882 tanks

Casualties and losses
c. 34,957 (POW); 300 guns; 100 armoured vehicles	
- Lille, capital of Nord-Pas de Calais region and the prefecture of the Nord department

The siege of Lille or Lille pocket (28–31 May 1940) took place during the Battle of France in the Second World War. The siege of the French IV Corps and V Corps (about 40,000 men) of the First Army (General René Prioux) was conducted by four German infantry divisions supported by three panzer divisions.

The III Corps of the First Army had managed to retreat to the Lys river with the British Expeditionary Force (BEF) divisions nearby. The two surrounded French corps resisted German attacks until forced to surrender at midnight on 31 May/1 June. The defence of the Lille Pocket enabled more Allied troops to retreat into the Dunkirk perimeter and take part in the Battle of Dunkirk.

== Prelude ==
During the morning of 27 May, the 1st Panzer Division attacked Gravelines on the western side of the Dunkirk perimeter and cut off the garrison and its commander, général de corps d'armée Bertrand Fagalde was captured; the remaining French fought on. To the south, German panzers crossed the river Aa and other German troops advanced on Wormhoudt. Two panzer divisions crossed La Bassée Canal and overran the British 2nd Division. The 7th Panzer Division rushed the gap and reached the X Armeekorps, cutting off the Allied troops in Lille. On the night of 27/28 May, the BEF divisions near Lille were able to retreat over the Lys but only the three infantry divisions of the III Corps (général de corps d'armée Léon de la Laurencie) of the French First Army (General René Prioux) managed to get away. Many of the French units that had retreated from much further south were still in the salient around Lille when the 6th Army (Generalleutnant Walther von Reichenau) surrounded the city.

== Siege ==
The forces in Lille, commanded by Général de corps d'armée Jean-Baptiste Molinié, were fortunate that a patrol captured Generalleutnant (Lieutenant-General) Fritz Kühne, commander of the 253rd Infantry Division and recovered documents showing the positions of the German troops surrounding the city. Molinié used the information to plan a breakout for 28 May. At 7:30 p.m. the IV Corps (général de corps d'armée André Boris) and V Corps (General Darius Bloch) attempted to break out on the west side of Lille and retreat towards the Lys. The 2e Division d'infanterie nord-africaine (2e DINA, Major-General Pierre Dame) tried to cross the Deûle river over the bridge to Sequedin (just south of Lomme). The 5e Division d'infanterie nord-africaine (5e DINA, Major-General Augustin Agliany) tried to escape over the Moulin Rouge bridge on the Santes road, south of Haubourdin. Another attempt was made during the morning of 29 May; the Germans had mined the bridge but two French tanks and two companies of infantry got across but were then forced back.

Molinié and five divisions of the First Army fought from house to house in the suburbs of Lille, German troops trying to infiltrate the French defences through gaps and among the many civilian refugees stranded in the city. On 29 May, the 15e DIM surrendered; with food and ammunition dwindling, Molinié and Colonel Aizier negotiated a surrender and hostilities ended at midnight on Friday 31 May/Saturday 1 June. Molinié, another 349 officers, and 34,600 French troops surrendered to the Germans at the Grand Place. The German commander, General Alfred Wäger, allowed the French the honours of war; the garrison paraded through the Grand Place, as German troops stood to attention, a compliment for which Wäger was reprimanded.

== Aftermath ==
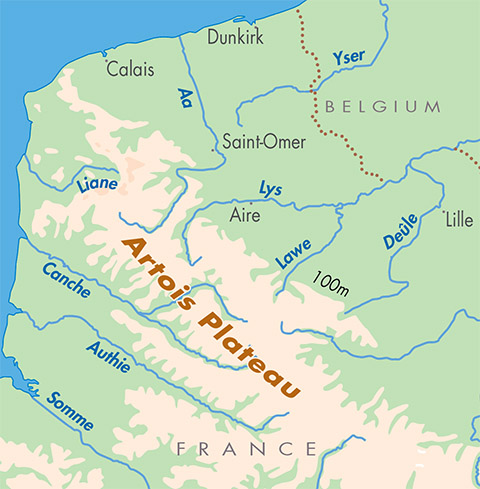
Waterways in northern France and Belgium

Some parties of French troops managed to get out of the pocket; Capitaine Philippe de Hauteclocque, the chief of staff of the 4e DI escaped and reached the 7e Armée on the Somme. By the time of the surrender Operation Dynamo, the Dunkirk evacuation, had been running for a week. In The Second World War (1949), Winston Churchill described the Allied defence of Lille as a "splendid contribution" that delayed the German advance for four days and allowed the escape of the British Expeditionary Force from Dunkirk. William L. Shirer wrote in 1969 that the "gallant" defence of Lille "helped the beleaguered Anglo-French forces around the port to hold out for an additional two to three days and thus save at least 100,000 more troops". The defenders of Lille were the only garrison accorded honours of war during the campaign of 1940 and with the defenders of Fort Vaux during the Battle of Verdun in 1916, one of only two French garrisons to receive this distinction by Germany in both world wars.

Alistair Horne wrote in 1982 that the French defence of Lille enabled the BEF and the rest of the First Army to retreat into the Dunkirk perimeter and in 2013, Douglas Fermer wrote that the Battle of Lille diverted about seven German divisions during the evacuation of Dunkirk. In a 2016 publication, Lloyd Clark wrote that the French breakout attempts were doomed to fail but that the German besiegers had been held off for four days when the Dunkirk perimeter was being consolidated. Feldmarschall (Field Marshal) Walther von Brauchitsch blamed the halt order to the panzer divisions, issued by Hitler, for the delay; had the panzer forces been allowed to continue the pocket would have been sealed along the coast, preventing the Allied evacuation.

=== Casualties ===
Lloyd Clark wrote in his 2016 publication that the Germans took prisoner "seven generals, 350 officers and 34,600 men, 300 guns and 100 armoured vehicles....".

== Orders of battle ==
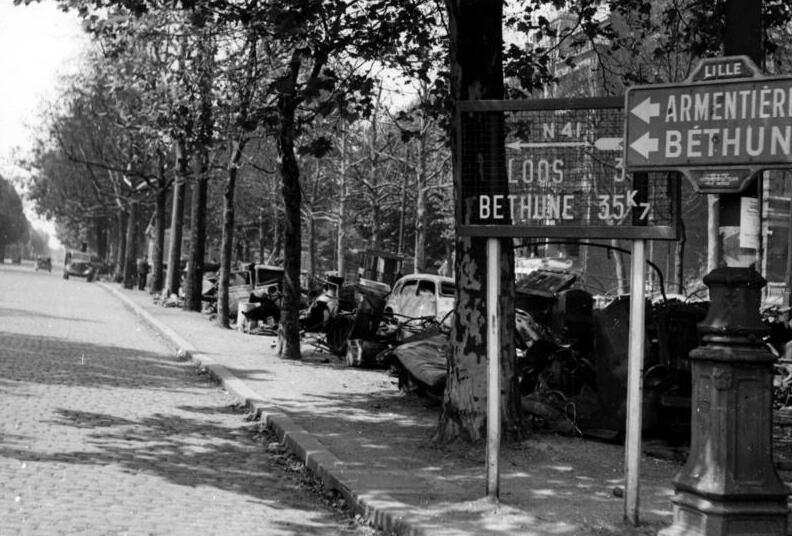
Wrecked vehicles near Lille in 1940

French
Commander: Général de corps d'armée Jean-Baptiste Molinié Data from Lloyd Clark (2016) unless specified.

- III Corps (général de corps d'armée de La Laurencie)
  - 1^{e} Division d'Infanterie Motorisée
  - 2^{e} Division d'infanterie nord-africaine
- IV Corps (général de corps d'armée André Boris)
  - 1^{e} division d'infanterie marocaine
  - 15^{e} Division d'Infanterie Motorisée (Général de brigade Alphonse Juin)
- V Corps (général de corps d'armée Darius Paul Bloch [Dassault])
  - 5^{e} Division d'infanterie nord-africaine

German

- XXVII Corps (General der Infanterie Alfred Wäger)
  - 4th Panzer Division
  - 253rd Infantry Division
- XV (Motorised) Corps (General der Infanterie Hermann Hoth)
  - 5th Panzer Division
  - 7th Panzer Division
- XI Corps (Generalleutnant Joachim von Kortzfleisch)
  - 7th Infantry Division
- 217th Infantry Division
- Army Group A Reserve
  - 267th Infantry Division

== See also ==
- List of French military equipment of World War II
- List of German military equipment of World War II
