= Jean-Baptiste Molinié =

French Army officer (1880–1971)

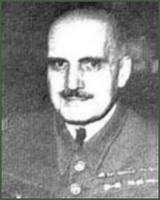
- Born: 21 September 1880; Bayonne, Pyrénées-Atlantiques, France
- Died: 13 January 1971 (aged 90); 5th arrondissement of Paris
- Military career
- Rank: Général de division
- Commands: 25th Motorized Division; Groupement Molinié
- Conflicts: Siege of Lille.
- Awards: Légion d'honneur (Grand-Officier)

Jean-Baptiste Emmanuel Molinié, (21 September 1880 – 13 January 1971) was general in the French Army who commanded the 25th Motorized Division and the Groupement Molinié during the Siege of Lille in May 1940.

== Biography ==
Jean-Baptiste Emmanuel Molinié was born on 21 September 1880 in Bayonne. He was the son of Jean Baptiste Camille Molinié and of Maria Refugio Alexandria de la Puente.

He entered Saint-Cyr in 1900, in the promotion Tchad and graduated in 1902, he was assigned as a Sub-lieutenant of infantry in the 107th Infantry Regiment.

On 24 March 1906, he married Marie Léonie Joséphine Marthe Léglise.

He participated in World War I and was cited four times.

He was promoted to Brigadier general on 28 May 1936 and then to Divisional general on 9 September 1939. On 2 September 1939 he was given command of the 25th Motorized Division, part of the 7th Army under general Giraud.

On 25 May 1940, during the Battle of France, his division ended up besieged in the Lille pocket along with other units retreating. As the most senior officer in Lille, he took command of the defence of the city along with three brigadier generals: Alphonse Juin, Pierre Dame, and Léon Jenoudet.

The three pockets of resistance regroup into 35,000–40,000 soldiers. During the night of 27–28 May, they tried to escape the city, but only ended up losing much of their ammunition. By 31 May, they could no longer resist and Molinié accepted an offer from general Waeger to surrender with honour. A ceasefire took into effect at 5pm. On 1 June, the Germans paid honours to the defenders who laid down their arms in front of the railway station. Molinié became a POW in the Königstein Fortress for the rest of the war.

In 1956, he wrote a study for National Defence named: La 25e Division motorisée dans la bataille de France.

Molinié died on 13 January 1971 in the 5th arrondissement of Paris.

== Distinctions ==
=== Legion of Honour ===
Ribbon bar	class	Date	Source
	Grand Officer	17 January 1952	
	Commander	22 November 1940	
	Officer	24 December 1931	
	Knight	28 December 1918	

=== Decorations ===
Ribbon bar	Name	Source
	War Cross 1914–1918 – 4 citations	
	War Cross 1939–1945 – 2 citations	
	War Cross 1914–1918 (Belgium)	

== Military ranks ==
Sub-Lieutenant	Lieutenant	Captain	Battalion chief
1 October 1902	1 October 1904	4 August 1914	25 June 1919 (Note: He already was acting battalion chief since 24 March 1918)
Lieutenant colonel	Colonel	Brigade general	Division general
25 September 1928	25 March 1933	28 May 1936	9 September 1939
