= Alfred Wäger =

- Born: 17 August 1883; Bamberg, German Empire
- Died: 9 July 1956 (aged 72); Baden-Baden, West Germany
- Military career
- Allegiance: German Empire (to 1918); Weimar Republic (to 1933); Nazi Germany
- Branch: Army
- Service years: 1901–1942
- Rank: General of the Infantry
- Commands: 10th Infantry Division; XXV Army Corps; XXVII Army Corps; Höheres Kommando z.b.V. XXXIV
- Conflicts: World War I World War II: Battle of France; Siege of Lille (1940); Battle of Moscow
- Awards: Iron Cross 1st Class; Eastern Front Medal

Alfred Wäger (17 August 1883 – 9 July 1956) was a General of the Infantry in the Wehrmacht of Nazi Germany during the Second World War who commanded several units.

== Early career ==
Alfred Wäger was born on 17 August 1883, the son of wholesale merchant and commercial judge Ludwig Gottfried Wäger and his wife Blanka. He graduated from the Gymnasium in Bamberg in summer of 1901 and entered the Bavarian Army on 15 July 1901 as Fahnenjunker (Cadet Officer), being assigned to 19th Infantry Regiment (19. Infanterie-Regiment “König Viktor Emanuel III. von Italien”). During the following six years, Wäger served mostly in Erlangen and was consecutively promoted to Fähnrich (Officer candidate) in January 1902 and to Leutnant (second lieutenant) in March 1903.

In late June 1907, Wäger was transferred to 17th Infantry Regiment (17. Infanterie-Regiment “Orff”) in Germersheim, Rhineland and served as Platoon leader with the 5th Company before being promoted to Oberleutnant (First lieutenant) in October 1911 when he assumed command of the company. In October 1913, he was ordered to the Bavarian Staff College in Munich and studied the general staff training course.

With the outbreak of World War I, Wäger was appointed 2nd Adjutant of the 5th Landwehr Infantry Brigade under Colonel Otto Wening and took part in the combats on Western Front. He was promoted to Hauptmann in June 1915 and assumed duty as Adjutant of his brigade. Wäger was transferred to the staff of 6th Royal Bavarian Division in November 1916 and took part in the combats in Flanders. He was assigned to 214th Infantry Division in September 1917.

== World War II ==
After the beginning of the Second World War, Wäger was the commanding general of the XXV Army Corps. From 6 November 1939 to 23 December 1941, he led the XXVII Army Corps in the West. Finally, he commanded the Höheres Kommando z.b.V. XXXIV on the central section of the Eastern Front, which was defeated in the Battle of Moscow. He was transferred to the Führerreserve in early January 1942 and finally retired in August 1942.

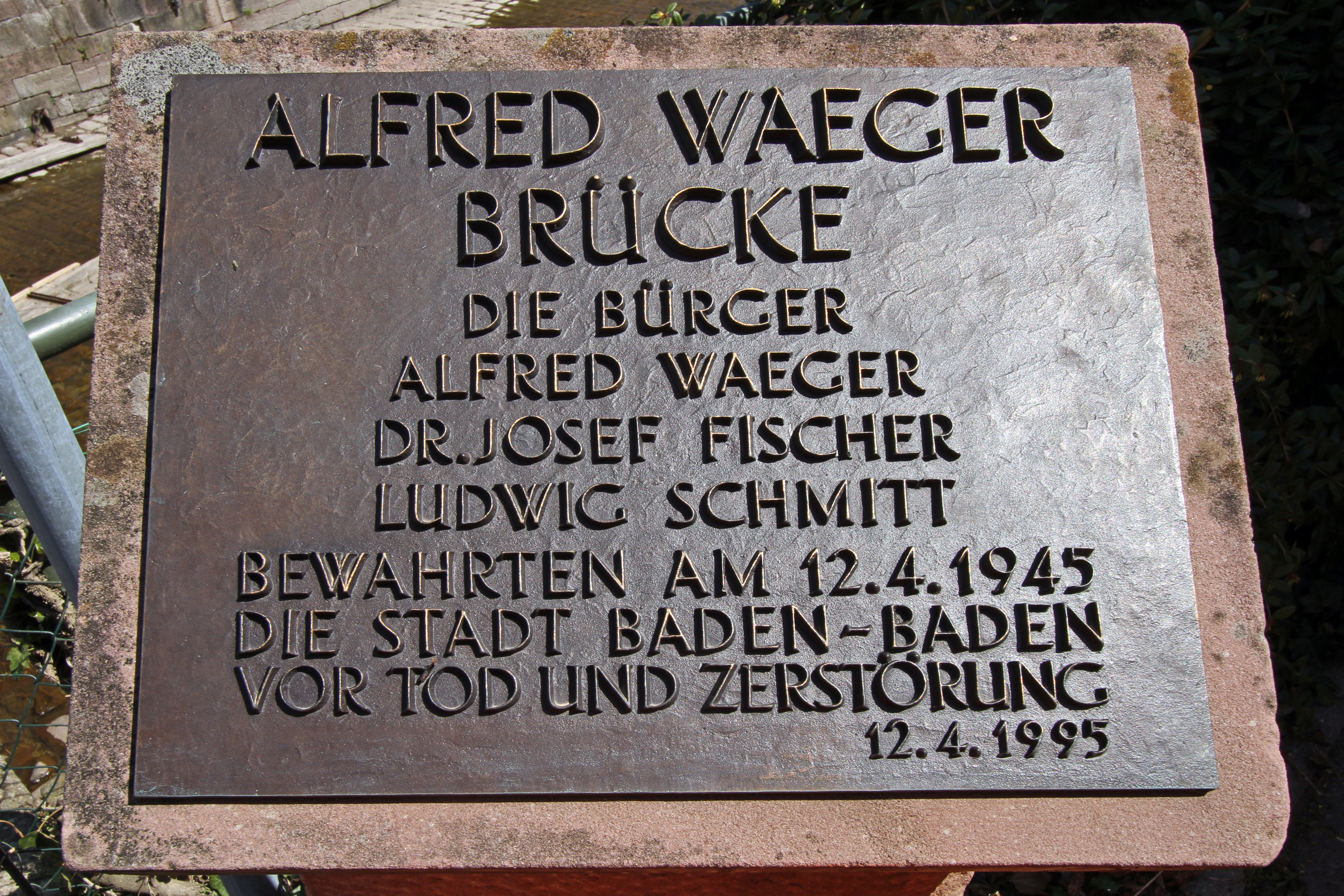
Memorial plaque on the Alfred Wäger Bridge in Baden-Baden

Wäger settled in Baden-Baden and in the last days of the war was able to hand over the city to the advancing French without a fight. A bridge over the Oos river was named after him in 1995.

== Decorations ==
- Clasp to the Iron Cross (1939)
  - 2nd Class
  - 1st Class
- Prussian Iron Cross (1914)
  - 2nd Class (World War I)
  - 1st Class (World War I)
- Saxon Albert Order, Knight's Cross 2nd Class with Swords (World War I)
- Bavarian Military Merit Order, 4th Class with Swords (World War I)
- Bavarian Prince Regent Luitpold Medal (prewar World War I)
- Bavarian Service Cross
- Eastern Front Medal
- Wehrmacht Long Service Award, 1st Class
- Honour Cross of the World War 1914/1918

== Sources ==
- Alfred Wäger on lexikon-der-wehrmacht
- Armed conflicts

Military offices
Preceded by None	Commander of 10. Infanterie-Division; 10 October 1935 – 1 March 1938	Succeeded by Generalleutnant Conrad von Cochenhausen
Preceded by None	Commander of XXV. Armeekorps; 24 November 1938 – 6 November 1939	Succeeded by General der Infanterie Karl Ritter von Prager
Preceded by General der Infanterie Karl Ritter von Prager	Commander of XXVII. Armeekorps; 6 November 1939 – 23 December 1941	Succeeded by General der Infanterie Eccard Freiherr von Gablenz
Preceded by General der Infanterie Hermann Metz	Commander of Höheres Kommando z.b.V. XXXIV; 23 December 1941 – 31 January 1942	Succeeded by none
