= Fritz von Brodowski =

German general

- Born: November 26, 1886; Köslin, Pomerania, German Empire
- Died: October 28, 1944 (aged 57) near Besançon, France
- Military career
- Allegiance: German Empire; Weimar Republic; Nazi Germany
- Branch: Imperial German Army; Reichsheer; German Army
- Service years: 1904–1944
- Rank: Generalleutnant
- Conflicts: World War I; World War II; Eastern Front; Western Front

Friedrich Wilhelm Konrad von Brodowski, known as Fritz, (November 26, 1886 – October 28, 1944) was a German army general of the Second World War, successively Commander in Kiev, Ukraine, Commander in Lille, and commanding officer at Clermont-Ferrand.

He was controversially killed while a prisoner of war of French forces in 1944. His death led to the murder, by way of a reprisal, of an imprisoned French army general, Gustave Mesny.

== Biography ==
Fritz von Brodowski was the son of Prussian General Fedor von Brodowski (1841–1923).

On March 10, 1904, in Brandenburg an der Havel, Brodowski was admitted as an officer cadet into the 6th (Brandenburg) Cuirassiers "Emperor Nicholas I of Russia" of the Prussian Army. From November 6, 1904, to July 8, 1905, he studied at the Glogau Military School and subsequently was commissioned as a lieutenant. Brodowski served within his regiment from October 21, 1908, as the "Gerichtsoffizier" (that is, an officer for legal matters) and on October 18, 1909, was transferred to the Guards Cuirassiers. From October 1, 1912, Brodowski underwent further training at the Prussian Military Academy, which he left upon the outbreak of the First World War in July 1914.

=== First World War ===
After mobilization, Brodowski served first as a squadron officer and then, from August 6, 1914, as an aide-de-camp on the staff of the 3rd and 1st Cavalry Brigades. He was promoted to captain on December 24, 1914. At the end of June 1917 he was transferred to the reserve squadron of the Guards Cuirassier Regiment and commanded the reserve battalion of the Kaiser Franz Garde-Grenadier-Regiment 2. A month later, Brodowski joined a battalion of the Queen Elizabeth Garde-Grenadier-Regiment Nr. 3. There, he was entrusted with the leadership of the Fusilier Battalion on August 4, 1917. Brodowski was wounded on September 30, 1918, during the defensive battles on the Western Front near Cambrai and Saint-Quentin, and spent the remaining weeks of the war in hospital.

For his wartime achievements, he was awarded the Knight's Cross of the Royal House Order of Hohenzollern, the Iron Cross first and second class, the Wound Badge in black as well as the Knight's Cross 2nd Class of the Order of the Zähringer Lion with swords and oak leaves and the Knight's Cross First Class of the Order of Albert with swords.

After his recovery, in December 1918, Brodowski was transferred to the General Staff of the army in Berlin. On January 18, 1919, he returned to the demobilizing Guards Cuirassiers. Elements of the regiment became Freikorps formations and Brodowski on February 1, 1919, was appointed as the leader of a volunteer squadron. On April 11, 1919, he was reappointed to the Provisional Reichswehr and on November 1, 1919, assigned to the 3rd Cavalry Regiment. Brodowski was squadron commander of the 4th (Prussian) Cavalry Regiment from February 24, 1920, to March 31, 1922. He was then transferred to the Ministry of Defence in Berlin for one year. He was promoted to lieutenant colonel on April 1, 1931, and on November 1, 1931, was given command of the 16th Cavalry Regiment in Kassel. In this position he was promoted to colonel on October 1, 1933. With the transition of the Reichswehr into the Wehrmacht, on April 13, 1935, Brodowski was appointed inspector of military recruitment at Ulm. He was further promoted to major general on January 1, 1937. From May 1938 to December 26, 1941, he was inspector of the Armed Forces Reserves, based in Stuttgart.

=== Second World War ===
In June 1942, Brodowski was appointed as head of the Feldersatz-Division B (Replacement Field Division B), gathering replacement troops to defend the River Don line. From September 25, 1942, to March 14, 1943, he commanded the 404th Division (Landesschützen) in Dresden. Brodowski was then appointed chief of staff for instruction to the commander of the Wehrmacht in Netherlands. He was then successively commander in Kiev, Ukraine, in the summer of 1943, then commander in Lille.

On April 15, 1944, Brodowski became commanding officer at Clermont-Ferrand, where he commanded Hauptverbindungsstäbe (HVS) 588, responsible for 9 departments in central France (an area of 65,000 square kilometers):

- Corrèze
- Haute-Vienne
- Creuse
- Dordogne
- Haute-Loire
- Puy-de-Dôme
- Cantal
- Allier
- Indre

The "Hauptverbindungsstäbe" were the main staff liaison placed with regional prefects who controlled, through the Verbindungsstäbe (VS), departmental prefects.

In May 1944, General von Brodowski, worried about concentrations of the maquis in Cantal, asked the Kommandant Heeresgebiet Südfrankreich (KHS), the military command of the Army area in Southern France, to transfer to Lyon troop units to combat the resistance. General Curt von Jesser in May 1944 created the Jesser Column, a force of about 5,000 soldiers, including units of the 2nd SS Panzer Division Das Reich, to suppress and destroy the Maquis in the Auvergne and Limousin regions from June to August 1944. These units wiped out the population of the town of Oradour-sur-Glane in June 1944, shortly after the Allied landings in Normandy, and Brodowski was therefore seen by the French as one of those responsible.

In September 1944, Brodowski was the head of the Kampfgruppe "von Brodowski" and fought in the Battle of the Vosges. Brodowski was captured by French troops near Jussey on October 27, 1944. He was imprisoned in the fortress of Besançon and was there held in solitary confinement by the French Forces of the Interior. He was shot dead on October 28 by his guards. According to the guards, Brodowski had attempted to escape. Brodowski was buried with military honors by the French military authorities, who investigated the guards' actions and came to the formal conclusion that Brodowski had attempted to escape. However, the killing remained unresolved.

Brodowski's death was announced on November 8, 1944, by the French channel Radio Londres and the Swiss News Agency on the following day. Adolf Hitler then ordered the randomly chosen murder of a French general, Maurice Mesny, as a reprisal. Mesny was killed by the SS on January 19, 1945, in the course of a prison transfer.

== Awards ==
- Knight's Cross of the Royal House Order of Hohenzollern
- Iron Cross (1914)
  - 2nd Class
  - 1st Class
- Wound Badge (1914) in Black
- Knight's Cross 2nd Class of the Order of the Zähringer Lion with Oak Leaves and Swords
- Knight's Cross First Class of the Order of Albert with Swords
