= 5th North African Infantry Division =

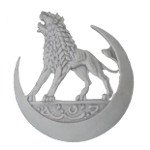
The 5th North African Infantry Division symbol

The 5th North African Infantry Division was a French Army formation during World War II.

== History ==
The Division was created in September 1939 and was dissolved in June 1940 following the invasion of France. The Division was commanded by Generals

- Ferdinand Vieillard (until 19 April 1940)
- Augustin Agliany (until 16 May 1940)
- Gustave Mesny (until taken POW on 31 May 1940).

During the Battle of France in May 1940 the division was made up of the following units:

- 6 Moroccan Tirailleurs Regiment
- 14 Zouaves Regiment
- 24 Tunisian Tirailleurs Regiment
- 95 Reconnaissance Battalion
- 22 Colonial Artillery Regiments
- 222 Colonial Artillery Regiment.

It was an active division which existed during between September 1939 and June 1940. The Tirailleurs Regiments were made up of native troops from North Africa. The Zouaves Regiment was made up from European settlers in North Africa and some recruited from France.
