= Apocalypse (disambiguation) =

Apocalypse is a genre of revelatory literature, or, by metonymy, a large-scale catastrophic event.

Apocalypse may also refer to:

== Film ==
- Apocalypse (film series), an eschatological film franchise
  - Apocalypse (film), 1998
- The Apocalypse (2000 film), a biblical TV film
- Apocalypse: The Second World War, a 2009 French documentary
- Resident Evil: Apocalypse, a 2004 film
- Superman/Batman: Apocalypse, a 2010 animated film
- X-Men: Apocalypse, a 2016 film
- This Is the End, a 2013 film, working title The Apocalypse

== Gaming ==
- Apocalypse: The Game of Nuclear Devastation, a board game released in 1980
  - Apocalypse: The Game of Nuclear Devastation (video game), a 1983 video game based on the board game
- Apocalypse (chess variant)
- Apocalypse (Magic: The Gathering), an expansion set of the card game
- Apocalypse (1990 video game)
- Apocalypse (1994 video game)
- Apocalypse (1998 video game)
- Apocalypse, an expansion for Call of Duty: Black Ops II
- Apocalypse (Mayfair Games), a 1993 role-playing game supplement
- Shin Megami Tensei IV: Apocalypse, a 2016 role-playing video game
- Warhammer 40,000 Apocalypse, an expansion for the wargame
- Werewolf: The Apocalypse, a role-playing game
- X-COM: Apocalypse, a 1997 PC strategy game

== Literature ==
- Apocalypse, a 1931 commentary on the Book of Revelation by D. H. Lawrence
- Apocalypse (Bowler novel), 2004
- Apocalypse (character), a Marvel Comics supervillain
  - Apocalypse in other media
- Apocalypse (Star Wars novel), 2012
- Apocalypse Culture, sometimes just called Apocalypse, 1987 anthology by Adam Parfrey
- Apocalypses, a 1977 collection of two fantasy novellas by R. A. Lafferty

== Music ==
- Apocalypse (band), a Brazilian progressive rock band
  - Apocalypse (Apocalypse album), 1991
- Apocalypse (Bill Callahan album), 2011
- Apocalypse (Mahavishnu Orchestra album), 1974
- Apocalypse (Primal Fear album) or the title song, 2018
- Apocalypse (Thundercat album), 2013
- Apocalypse: Save Us, 2022
- "Apocalypse" (Cigarettes After Sex song), a song by Cigarettes After Sex from Cigarettes After Sex, 2017
- "Apocalypse", by Jesper Kyd from the video game Hitman: Blood Money, 2006
- "Apocalypse", by Lacuna Coil from Black Anima, 2019
- "The Apocalypse", by Lovebites from The Lovebites EP, 2017
- Alpocalypse, an album by "Weird Al" Yankovic, 2011

== Roller coasters and Amusement rides ==
- Apocalypse (Drayton Manor), in England
- Apocalypse (Six Flags America), formerly at Six Flags America
- Apocalypse: The Ride, at Six Flags Magic Mountain

== Television ==
- "Derren Brown: Apocalypse", a 2012 British two-part series
- 10.5: Apocalypse, a 2006 American miniseries
- American Horror Story: Apocalypse, a season of the American anthology series
- "Apocalypse" (Bottom), a 1991 episode
- "Apocalypse" (Taggart), a 1997 episode
- Apocalypse: the Cold War, a 2019 French TV series
- Apocalypse: Hitler, a 2011 French TV series
- Apocalypse: Stalin, a 2015 French TV series
- Apocalypse: World War I, a 2014 French TV series
- Apocalypse: The Second World War, a 2009 French TV series
- Apocalypse: Never-Ending War 1918–1926, a 2018 French TV series
- "Apocalypse", a 2008 episode of Smallville

== Other uses ==
- Apocalypse (Dürer), a series of woodcuts by Albrecht Dürer
- Apocalypsis (moth), a genus of moths
- Apocalypse Ltd, British publishing company
- Climate apocalypse, a postulated global collapse of human civilization as a result of climate change
- Book of Revelation, also called the Apocalypse of John

== See also ==
- Apocalypse Now (disambiguation)
- Apocalipsis (disambiguation)
- Apokolips, the fictional planet in DC Comics
