= Daniel Costelle =

French filmmaker (1936–2026)

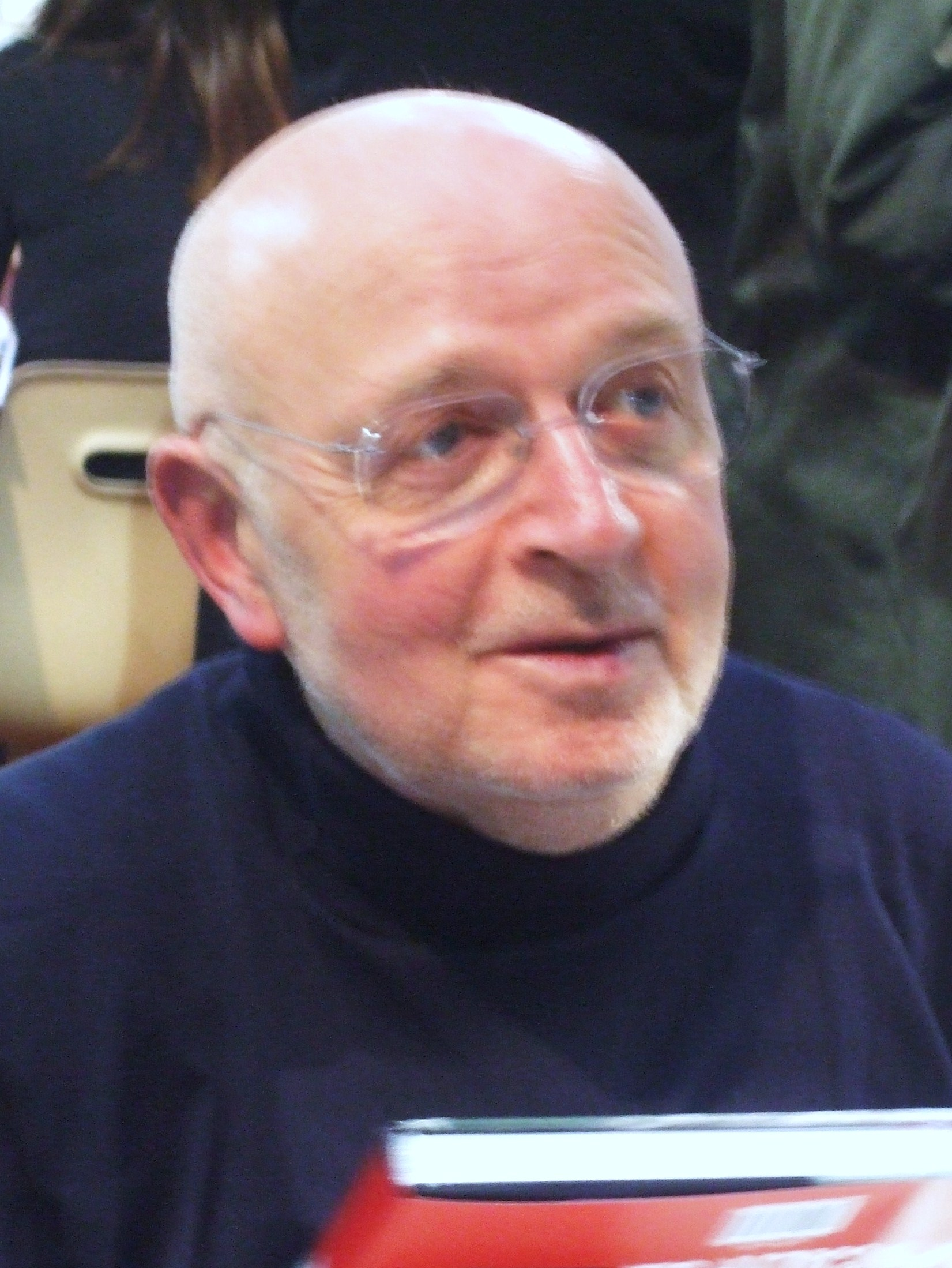
- Costelle in 2010
- Born: 11 May 1936; Livry-Gargan, France
- Died: 2 June 2026 (aged 90)
- Occupations: Documentarist; film director

Daniel Costelle (French: [danjˈɛl kɔstˈɛl]; 11 May 1936 – 2 June 2026) was a French documentarist and film director. For his work, he was made a Knight of the Legion of Honour.

== Career ==
In 1955, Costelle enrolled at the Centre d'Etudes de Radio-Télévision. Two years later, he directed his first short film, Le Jeu de la Nuit, alongside Maurice Pialat and Stéphane Audran. He directed many short films and also wrote a book titled Les Prisonniers in 1975. Between 1964 and 1989, he produced several historical series such as Histoire de l’Aviation, which was rebroadcast on RMC Découverte 40 years after its initial release. In 1991, he directed his only-ever feature film, Apparition à Fatima. His 1994–1995 series Les Oubliés de la Libération, which was broadcast on TF1, was nominated for an International Emmy Award. In 2001, he co-founded a production company, CC&C – Clarke Costelle et Cie. In 2017, the company was acquired by Mediawan.

=== The Apocalypse docuseries ===
In 2009, he directed the six-part docuseries Apocalypse: The Second World War, which was considered to be revolutionary in documentary filmmaking by relying entirely upon historical footage instead of interviews with historians or videos of reenactments. However, its decision to colorize the photography and videography was met with some controversy among historians, though defended by Costelle using the logic of avoiding "giving any ammunition to Holocaust deniers. The second installation in the Apocalypse series, Apocalypse: World War I, influenced filmmaker Albert Dupontel and cinematographer Vincent Mathias to create the film See You up There, which won numerous César Awards. The narrator, Mathieu Kassovitz, drew his narrative model from Costelle directly. His documentary aimed to portray the war through the eyes of those who lived through it, which received praise from Marianne. He also promoted the idea of colorizing the footage of the war, which, according to him, made it less boring and was a good pedagogical tool.

In addition to critical acclaim, Apocalypse was a major ratings success, with the final two episodes drawing over eight million viewers on France 2. It appeared at the Globe de Cristal Awards in 2009 and achieved triple diamond DVD status. It was also the first-ever historical documentary released on Blu-ray. The rest of the Apocalypse collection also achieved excellent ratings, with World War I garnering 11 million views. It is the second-largest French production distributed globally, falling behind only the animated children's series Pat the Dog. In 2016, it became available for streaming, first on Netflix and then on Salto.

=== Accolades and controversies ===
In June 2003, Costelle became a Knight of the Legion of Honour.

In November 2009, the historian Lionel Richard revealed in an article in Le Monde diplomatique that many of the insinuations made in Apocalypse were unsubstantiated and that most of the archival footage used constituted propaganda, as it was filmed by professionals working for the armed forces.

Remarks made by Costelle during a France Culture broadcast in November 2019 regarding the documentary Apocalypse: the Cold War sparked controversy. During the program, the filmmaker asserted, "there has never been such a thing as American imperialism." Costelle also declared, "communist historians are accomplices to the Gulag".

== Personal life ==
Costelle was born in Livry-Gargan on 11 May 1936. He was married to Isabelle Clarke, with whom he co-directed numerous documentaries.

Costelle died on 2 June 2026, at the age of 90.
