= Apokalypsis =

Apokalypsis is the Greek word for "revelation". It may refer to:

- Revelation
- Book of Revelation
- Apocalypse
- Apokalypsis, Greek-language oratorio and album by René Clemencic
- Apokalypsis (album), a 2011 album by Chelsea Wolfe

== See also ==
- Apocalypse (disambiguation)
