= Serge Koster =

French writer and academic (1940–2022)

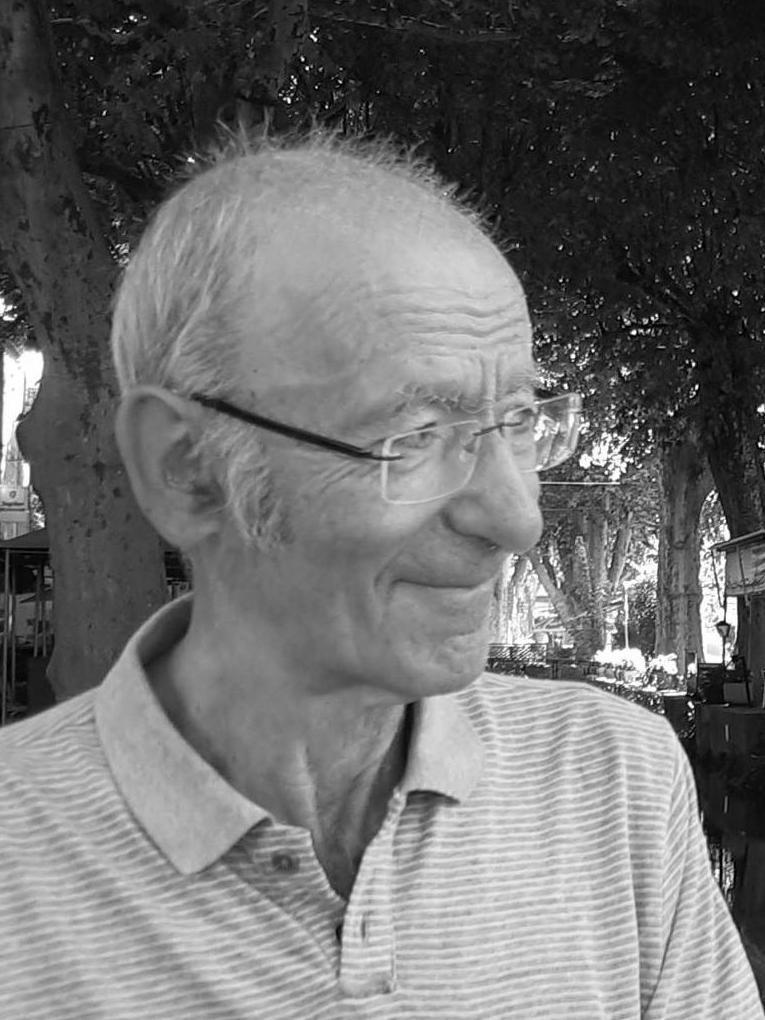
- Born: 3 August 1940; Paris, France, Germany
- Died: 12 January 2022 (aged 81)
- Education: Lycée Louis-le-Grand; Lycée Lakanal
- Occupations: Writer; Professor

Serge Koster (3 August 1940 – 12 January 2022) was a French writer and academic.

== Biography ==
Koster was born on 3 August 1940, into an Ashkenazi Jewish family from Poland. He met his wife, Geneviève, in 1960 and had a daughter, Delphine, as well as three grandchildren. In 1970, his father died in a traffic collision, which prompted him to write Le soleil ni la mort in 1975, edited by Maurice Nadeau.

After earning an agrégation in grammar, Koster became a French teacher at the Lycée Voltaire in Paris. He was a literary critic for the radio program Le Panorama that was broadcast on France Culture. He also edited the magazine La Quinzaine littéraire. Since 2015, he served on the editorial board of La Nouvelle Quinzaine littéraire.

Koster died on 12 January 2022, at the age of 81.

== Works ==
=== Novels ===
- Le Soleil ni la mort (1975)
- Le Rêve du scribe (1976)
- Une histoire qui ne finira jamais (1978)
- Les Langues de terre (1980)
- L'Homme suivi (1982)
- Le Voyage inachevé (1983)
- Une femme de si près tenue (1985)
- La Condition du passager (1987)
- L'Amour voyageur (1990)
- Trou de mémoire (2003)
- La Nuit passionnément (1993)
- À celle qui écoute (1994)
- Noëlle, cadeau (1998)
- La Tristesse du témoin (1999)
- J'ai dû heurter un astre. Triptyque amoureux (2000)
- Le Commerce des corps (2005)
- Ces choses qui blessent le cœur (2007)
- Figures de style (2021)
