= Apocalipsis =

Apocalipsis may refer to:

- Apocalypse
- Apocalipsis (wrestler), Mexican professional wrestler
- Apocalipsis (video game), 2018 video game

== See also ==
- Apocalypse (disambiguation)
