= Un siècle d'écrivains =

French television series

Un siècle d'écrivains ("a century of writers") was a French series of television documentary films aired on France 3 between 1995 and 2001. A total of 257 documentaries were made, each focusing on a writer active during the 20th century. The series was initiated by France 3's program director Jean-Pierre Cottet in the spring of 1994. Each episode was independently produced by different production companies and directors, restricted to a running time of 52 minutes. The episodes were presented by Bernard Rapp. The series ended with a special episode about Antoine Chuquet, an imaginary writer made up by the producers.

== List of episodes ==
This list is incomplete. It is ordered alphabetically after the author portrayed.

- Alain-Fournier by Jacques Tréfouël (1995)
- Jorge Amado by Henri Raillard (1995)
- Guillaume Apollinaire by Jean-Claude Bringuier (1998)
- Antonin Artaud by André S. Labarthe (2000)
- Audiberti, des tonnes de semences by Philippe Condroyer (1998)
- Marcel Aymé by Sylvain Roumette (1996)
- Maurice Barrès by Jean-Claude Lamy and Claude Vajda (1995)
- Hervé Bazin by Jean-Daniel Verhaeghe and Pierre Moustiers (1996)
- Simone de Beauvoir by Valérie Stroh and Pascale Fautrier (1999)
- Georges Bernanos by Patrick Zeyen (1995)
- Karen Blixen by Jean-Noël Cristiani (1995)
- Antoine Blondin by Jean-François Gire (1995)
- Borges, l'homme miroir by Alberto Manguel and Philippe Molins (1999)
- Henri Bosco by Jean-François Jung (2000)
- Mikhaïl Afanassievitch Boulgakov by Iossif Pasternak (1997)
- Emmanuel Bove by Hervé Duhamel (1996)
- René Guy Cadou (commentary by Jean Rouaud)
- Albert Camus by Calmette Joël and Jean-Daniel Verhaeghe (1999)
- Roger Caillois by Nicolas Stern and Dominique Rabourdin (1999)
- Italo Calvino by Edgardo Cozarinsky (1995)
- Alejo Carpentier : Ici et là-bas by Emilio Pacull (1997)
- Constantin Cavafis by Elgal Erera (1998)
- Jean Cayrol, Lazare parmi nous by Jean-Luc Alpigiano and Jacques Loiseleux (2000)
- Louis-Ferdinand Céline, un diamant noir comme l'enfer by Emmanuel Descombes and Alain Moreau (1998)
- Blaise Cendrars by Claude-Pierre Cahvanon
- Jacques Chardonne by Marie-Dominique Montel (2000)
- Andrée Chedid by Antoine Léonard and Vicky Sommet (1998)
- Agatha Christie maîtresse du mystère by Jérôme de Missolz (1995)
- Antoine Chuquet by Alain Wieder (2001)
- Cioran by Bernard Jourdain and Patrice Bollon (1999)
- Bernard Clavel by Claude Vajda (1999)
- Albert Cohen by Glenio Bonder and William Karel (1995)
- Colette by Jacques Tréfouël (1995)
- Arthur Conan Doyle by Marie-Dominique Montel (1997)
- Julio Cortázar by Chantal Rémy (1997)
- Michel Déon by Pierre Dupouey (1995)
- John Dos Passos by Daniel Costelle (1995)
- James Ellroy by Benoît Cohen and François Guérif (1999)
- Paul Éluard by Isabelle Clarke and Daniel Costelle (1995)
- William Faulkner by Marc Jampolsky and Michel Abescat (1995)
- Carlos Fuentes by Valeria Sarmiento and Guy Scarpetta (1998)
- Anatole France by François Chaye and Olivier Barrot (1995)
- Romain Gary by Olivier Mille and André Asséo (1999)
- Jean Genet by Michel Van Zele (1995)
- Michel de Ghelderode, l'Archange by Patrick Zeyen (1999)
- Jean Giono by Claude Santelli (1995)
- Jean Giraudoux by Philippe Piazza and Marcel Jullian (1995)
- Édouard Glissant by Patrick Chamoiseau, Claude Chonville and Guy Deslauriers (1996)
- Nadine Gordimer
- Julien Gracq by Michel Mitrani (1995)
- Graham Greene by Marie-Dominique Montel (1995)
- Louis Guilloux by Josiane Maisse (1996)
- Sacha Guitry by Marcel Jullian and Philippe Piazza (1995)
- Patricia Highsmith by Philippe Kohly (1995)
- Chester Himes en noir et blanc by Michel Lebrun and Godwin Djadja (1995)
- Bohumil Hrabal by Patrick Cazals (1995)
- Les Derniers jours d'Aldous Huxley by Béatrice Limare (1999)
- Eugène Ionesco (1909 - 1994) by Philippe Truffault (2000)
- Max Jacob by Alain Ferrari (1995)
- Alfred Jarry by Jean-Christophe Averty (1995)
- Pierre Jean Jouve by Olivier Mille and Robert Kopp
- James Joyce by Antoine Gallien (1995)
- Ernst Jünger by Gero von Boehm (1996)
- Kafka by Karel Procop (1995)
- Kipling ou le syndrome de Lahore (1865 - 1936) by Francis Guillery (1999)
- Giuseppe Tomasi di Lampedusa by Dominique Gros and Jean-Claude Navarro (1997)
- Valery Larbaud by François Chayé (1995)
- Thomas Edward Lawrence by Marie-Dominique Montel (1996)
- Paul Léautaud by Patrick Zeyen (1997)
- Michel Leiris ou l'homme sans honneur by Christophe Barreyre (1995)
- Gaston Leroux by Jean-François Jung (1995)
- Primo Levi
- Jack London, enfant rebelle du rêve californien by Michel Viotte (1995)
- Toute marche mystérieuse vers un destin, le cas Lovecraft by Pierre Trividic, Patrick Mario Bernard and Anne-Louise Trividic (1998)
- Carson McCullers by Fabrice Cazeneuve (1995)
- Vladimir Maiakovski
- Curzio Malaparte by Jean-Paul Fargier (1998)
- François Mauriac by Olivier Guiton and Jérôme Prieur (1995)
- Henri Michaux by Alain Jaubert (1995)
- Yukio Mishima by Jean-Claude Lubtchansky (1995)
- Alberto Moravia, l'homme qui regarde by Nico Di Biase (1998)
- Henry Miller by Robert Mugnerot (1995)
- Patrick Modiano by Paule Zajdermann and Antoine de Gaudemar (1996)
- Robert Musil by Alain Jaubert (1996)
- Pablo Neruda by Amalia Escriva (1998)
- Jean Paulhan, le don d'ubiquité by Jérôme Prieur (1998)
- Cesare Pavese by Alain Bergala (1995)
- Charles Péguy by Jean-Paul Fargier (1995)
- Georges Perros by Jérôme Garcin and Paul André Picton (1999)
- Jacques Prévert le cancre magnifique by Gilles Nadeau (1995)
- Fernando Pessoa le voyageur immobile by Isabel Calpe (1995)
- Marcel Proust by Pierre Dumayet (1995)
- André Pieyre de Mandiargues, l'amateur d'imprudence by Evelyne Clavaud (2000)
- Raymond Queneau by Robert Bobert (1995)
- Les Deux vies du chat Radiguet by Jean-Christophe Averty and Pierre Trividic (2000)
- Alain Robbe Grillet by Frédéric Compain (1999)
- Salman Rushdie by Elisa Mantin (1999)
- Ernesto Sábato by Gonzalo Arijon (1995)
- Françoise Sagan by Mona Makki and Dominique Gallet (1996)
- Antoine de Saint-Exupéry by Jacques Tréfouël (1996)
- Jérôme David Salinger by Benoît Jacquot (1996)
- Jean-Paul Sartre l'écriture by Dominique Masson (1995)
- Nathalie Sarraute by Jacques Doillon (1995)
- Leonardo Sciascia, une vérité née en Sicile by Françoise Gallo (1995)
- Victor Segalen un poète aventurier dans l'empire du ciel by Olivier Horn (1995)
- David Shahar by Elgal Erera (1999)
- Georges Simenon by Francis Lacassin (1997)
- Alexandre Soljenitsyne by Françoise Wolff and Michel Parfenoff (1999)
- Philippe Soupault by Antoine Gallien (2000)
- Portrait incomplet de Gertrude Stein by Arnaud des Pallières (1999)
- John Steinbeck ou l'esprit des lieux by Alain Gallet and Michel Le Bris (1995)
- André Suarès, l'insurgé by Françoise Gallo and Robert Parienté (1998)
- Rabindranath Tagore by Sylvain Roumette (1995)
- Paul Valéry by Pierre Dumayet and Robert Bober (1997)
- Marguerite Yourcenar by Dominique Gros (1995)
- Lu Xun by Henry Lange (1999)
