= Alain Jaubert =

French writer and journalist (1940–2025)

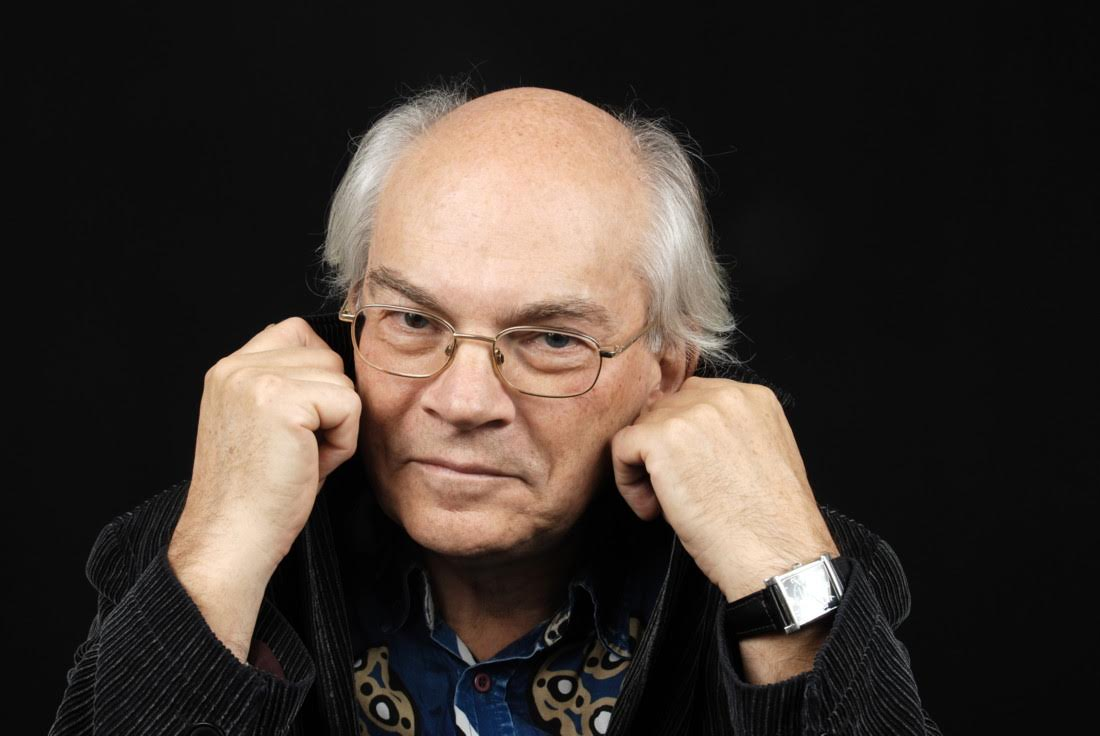
- Born: Alain Marcel André Antoine Jaubert; 29 July 1940; Paris, France
- Died: 15 March 2025 (aged 84); Paris, France
- Occupation: Writer • Journalist • Director

Alain Jaubert (1940 – 15 March 2025) was a French writer and journalist, producer and director of television, producer of the magazine Les Arts - France 3 and Oceaniques from 1990 to 1993 and author and director of the series "Palettes" since 1988. On 29 May 1971, he was victim of a "beating" in a police van when he wanted to accompany a person taken to the police station. The case made a great noise considering the personality of the journalist, then working for Le Nouvel Observateur. Jaubert died on 15 March 2025, at the age of 84.

== Filmography ==
For productions of INA.

- 1981 Trois histoires de Chine (54’), INA, diffusion RSS, unpublished in France.
- 1982 La Disparition (8’), INA, diffusion Antenne 2.
- La Flèche du temps, séquence dans Le Changement à plus d’un titre (émission anniversaire), INA, diffusion FR3.
- 1983 Conversations with Joseph Needham (55’), series "Mémoire", INA, diffusion TF1.
- Passions électriques (13’), INA, diffusion TF1 and RTBF.
- 1985 Auschwitz, l’album, la mémoire, INA/HEXAGRAMM, diffusion Antenne 2.
- 1986 Le Rhône (56’), series "Les Fleuves de la Méditerranée", INA/RAI/CNRS, diffusion RAI.

For "Océaniques" on FR3

- 1988 La bibliothèque idéale, Jorge Luis Borges au Collège de France, conversations with Robert Darnton, and Umberto Eco (2x45’).
- 1989 Entretien avec Octavio Paz, conversation with Mario Vargas Llosa.
- 1990 Entretien avec Stephen Jay Gould, Le Sacrifice (debate with Roberto Calasso and René Girard).
- 1992 Portrait d’un expert, Federico Zeri (2x55’).

For ARTE

- 1993 Citizen Barnes, an américan dream in collaboration with Philippe Pilard.
- Faux et images de faux, in collaboration with François Niney.
- Piero della Francesca.
- La voix.
- La Beat Generation in collaboration with Éric Sarner.
- Manifesto in collaboration with Michel le Bayon.
- 1994 Gustave Caillebotte ou les aventures du regard, 60’.
- 1988/2002 Series Palettes
- 1998 Giacomo Casanova
- 1999 La bibliothèque, rêves et légendes
- 2001 Nietzsche, un voyage philosophique

France 3

- 1995: Series Un siècle d'écrivains: Henri Michaux

== Books ==
- 1973: Dossier D... comme Drogue, Éditions Alain Moreau 1973
- 1986: Le Commissariat aux archives, Éditions Barrault, 1986.
- Ne pariez jamais votre tête au diable, translation and presentation of Edgar Allan Poe's short stories, Éditions Gallimard /Folio.
- 1993: Peinture cinéma et retour, Ministère des Affaires étrangères
- 1998: Palettes, text of 20 films of the series, Éditions Gallimard/Collection L'Infini
- 2005: Val Paradis, Prix Goncourt du premier roman.
- 2008: Lumière de l'image, Gallimard
- 2008: Une nuit à Pompéi, Gallimard
- 2011: D'Alice à Frankenstein, Lumière de l'image II, Gallimard
- 2011: Tableaux noirs, Gallimard
- 2013: Au bord de la mer violette, Gallimard, Prix Éric Tabarly 2014.
- 2015: Casanova l’aventure, Gallimard,
- 2016: La moustache d'Adolf Hitler et autres essais, Gallimard
