= Interallied Mission to Poland =

1920 Anglo-French diplomatic mission

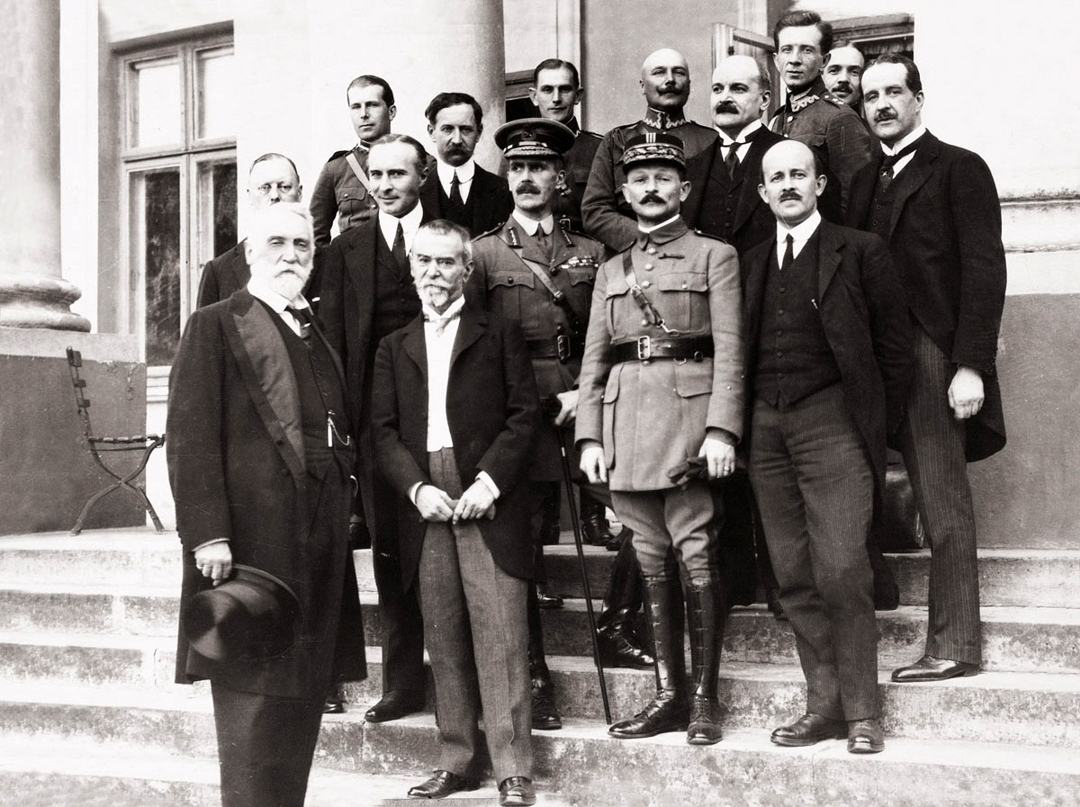
Members of Interallied Mission to Poland (1920). First row from the left: Edgar Vincent D’Abernon, Jean Jules Jusserand, Percy Radcliffe, Maxime Weygand, Maurice Hankey

The Interallied Mission to Poland was a diplomatic mission launched by British Prime Minister David Lloyd George on 21 July 1920, at the height of the Polish-Soviet War, weeks before the decisive Battle of Warsaw. The purpose of this mission was to send a number of high level personages from Britain and France to Poland in an attempt to influence Polish policy, possibly through effecting a change in government.

The mission members included French diplomat, Jean Jules Jusserand, general Maxime Weygand, chief of staff to Marshal Ferdinand Foch (the Supreme Commander of the victorious Entente), the British diplomat, Lord Edgar Vincent D'Abernon and the British general Percy Radcliffe. The crucial battle of Warsaw was won in the early days of August, before the mission could achieve anything of importance. The only tangible result was the installation of Weygand as an advisor to the Polish General Staff, where his role was negligible. Nevertheless, soon after the battle and for various political reasons, a myth arose that Weygand was the author of the Polish victory in the battle of Warsaw.

== Sources ==
- Norman Davies, White Eagle, Red Star: The Polish-Soviet War, 1919–20, Pimlico, 2003, ISBN 0-7126-0694-7.
- Piotr Wandycz, General Weygand and the Battle of Warsaw, in Journal of Central European Affairs, vol. 19 (1960), pp. 357–365.

== See also ==
- British Military Mission to Poland
- French Military Mission to Poland
