= Alain Bergala =

French film director

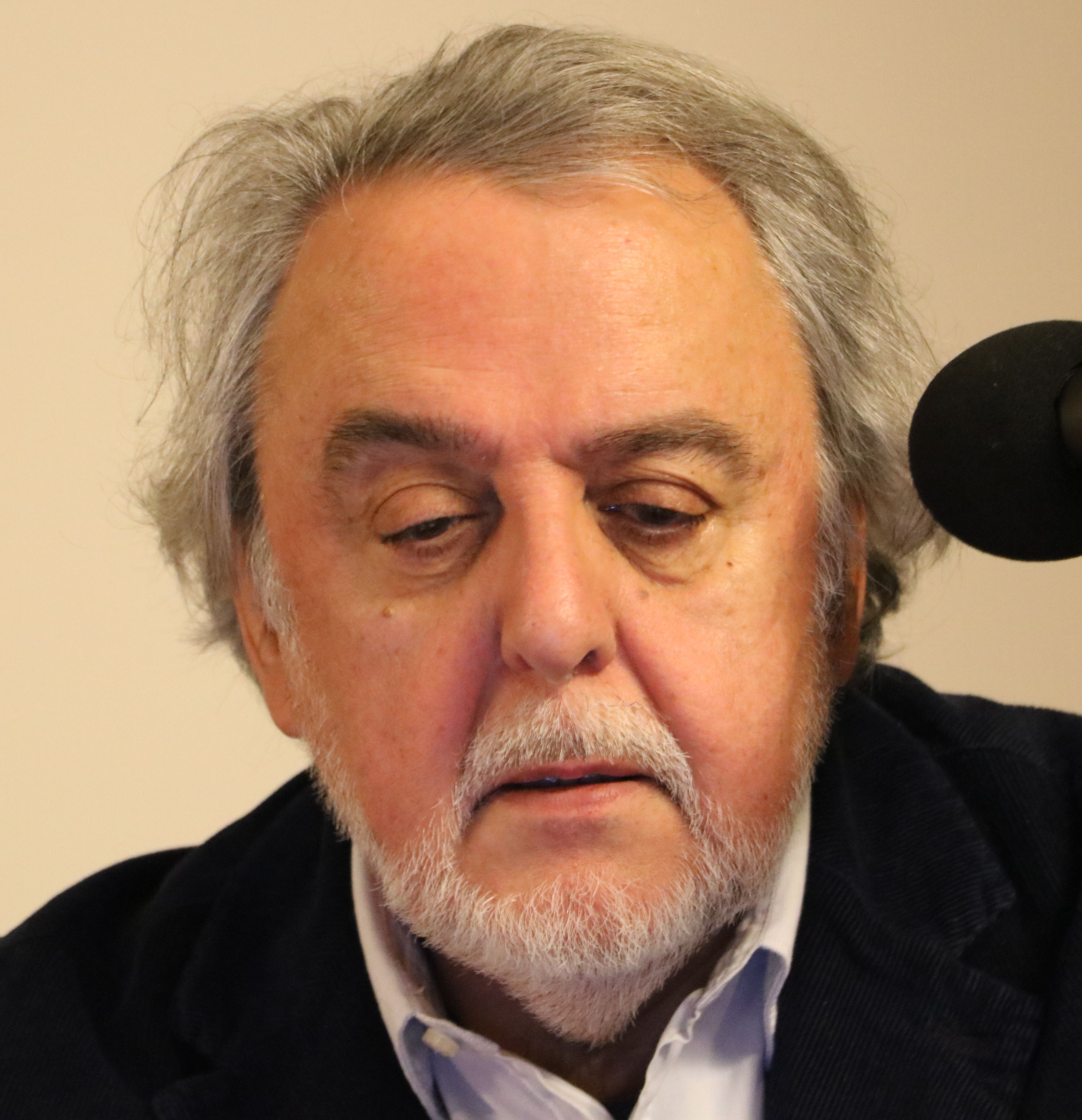
- Born: 8 August 1943 (age 83); Brignoles, France
- Education: University of Paris III: Sorbonne Nouvelle; La Fémis
- Occupations: film critic, essayist, screenwriter, director
- Relatives: Jean-Luc Godard

Alain Bergala (French: [bɛʁgala]; born 8 August 1943) is a French film critic, essayist, screenwriter and director.

== Biography ==
Former writer for Cahiers du cinéma, he is best known as a specialist in the works of Jean-Luc Godard.

He taught at the University of Paris III: Sorbonne Nouvelle and at La Fémis. In 2000, he became the cinema counsellor of Jack Lang with whom he worked regarding the arts in education.

He directed his first feature film in 1982.

== Filmography ==
- 1983: Faux fuyants (co-director : Jean-Pierre Limosin)
- 1987: Où que tu sois
- 1995: Cesare Pavese (part of the series- Un siècle d'écrivains)
- 1997: Fernand Léger, les motifs d'une vie
- 1998: D'Angèle à Toni

== Publications ==
- Books by Alain Bergala on Google Books
- Alain Bergala, The Cinema Hypothesis. Teaching Cinema in the Classroom and Beyond, FilmmuseumSynemaPublikationen Vol. 28, Vienna 2016, ISBN 978-3-901644-67-2
