= British Military Mission to Poland =

The British Military Mission to Poland was an effort by Britain to aid the nascent Second Polish Republic after it achieved its independence in November 1918, at the end of the First World War. It worked in parallel with the larger and much more significant French Military Mission to Poland. It was initially commanded by General Louis Botha, then by Adrian Carton De Wiart. Owing to debates within the British government on its policy towards the new government in Russia, the mission was not staffed or fully utilised when compared to the French mission.

The Mission was stood down in 1924 at the end of the Polish-Soviet War. It was briefly reactivated in 1939, again under Carton de Wiart, as part of the Anglo-Polish alliance in the run up to World War II. In September, as Poland fell to a combined German-Soviet invasion, the Mission's staff crossed into Romania.

== See also ==
- British Expeditionary Force
- Interallied Mission to Poland
