= Maxime Weygand =

French general (1867–1965)

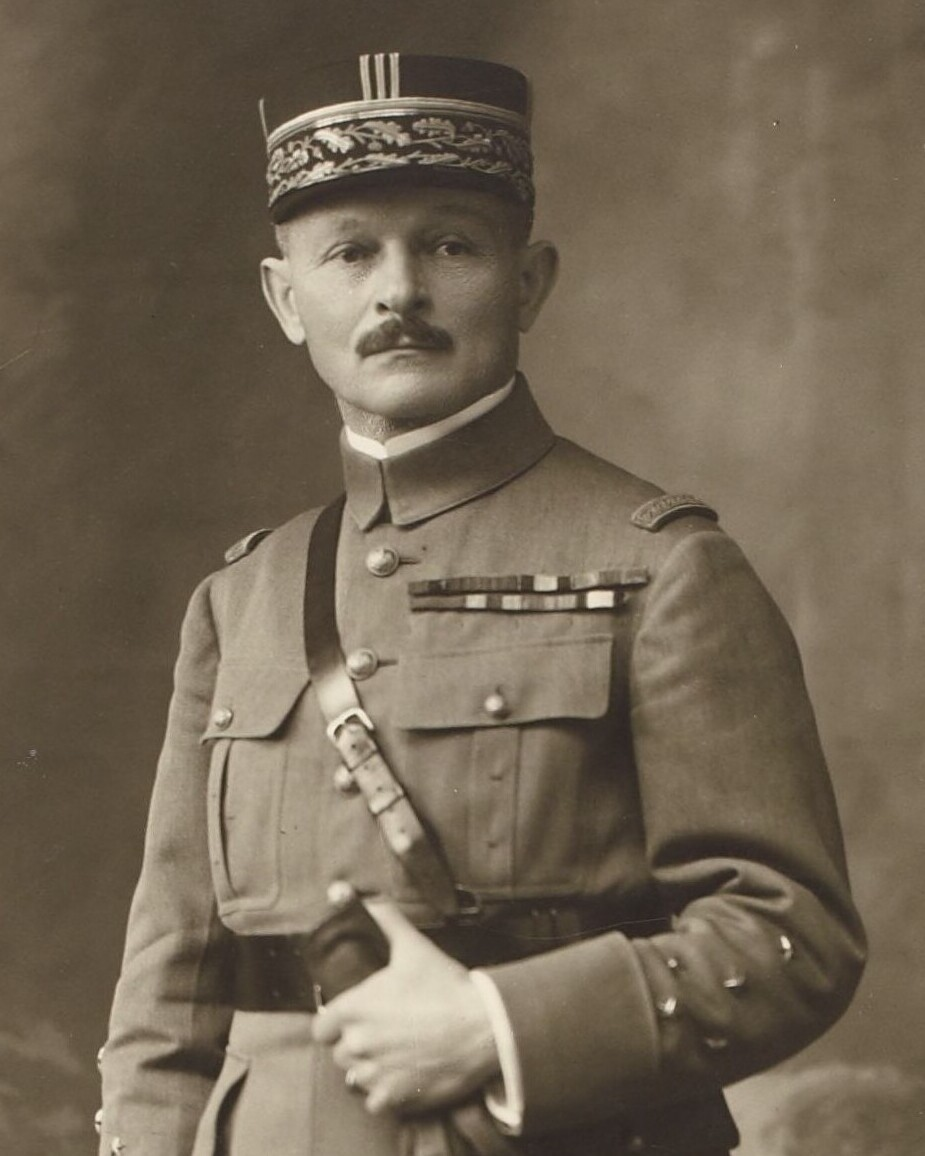
- General Weygand c. 1940

30th Chief of the Army Staff of France
- In office 3 January 1930 – 10 February 1931
- President: Gaston Doumergue
- Prime Minister: André Tardieu; Camille Chautemps; André Tardieu; Théodore Steeg; Pierre Laval
- Minister of War: André Maginot; Louis Barthou; André Maginot
- Preceded by: Eugène Debeney
- Succeeded by: Maurice Gamelin
- In office 20 May – 11 June 1940
- President: Albert Lebrun
- Prime Minister: Paul Reynaud
- Minister of War: Paul Reynaud
- Preceded by: Maurice Gamelin

Minister of National Defence of France (Note: Since 11 July 1940)
- In office 16 June – 5 September 1940 Serving with Minister of War Louis Colson
- President: Albert Lebrun (Note: Until 11 July 1940)
- Chief of State: Philippe Pétain (Note: Since 11 July 1940)
- Prime Minister: Philippe Pétain
- Vice President: Pierre Laval
- Preceded by: Paul Reynaud (as Minister of War of France)
- Succeeded by: Charles Huntziger

3rd High Commissioner of the Levant
- In office 19 April 1923 – 29 November 1924
- President: Alexandre Millerand; Gaston Doumergue
- Prime Minister: Raymond Poincaré; Frédéric François-Marsal; Édouard Herriot
- Minister of the Colonies: Albert Sarraut; Jean Fabry; Édouard Daladier
- Preceded by: Robert de Caix (as acting)
- Succeeded by: Maurice Sarrail

11th Vice-President of the Conseil supérieur de la guerre
- In office 9 January 1931 – 21 January 1935
- President: Gaston Doumergue; Paul Doumer; Albert Lebrun
- Prime Minister: Théodore Steeg; Pierre Laval; André Tardieu; Édouard Herriot; Joseph Paul-Boncour; Édouard Daladier; Albert Sarraut; Camille Chautemps; Édouard Daladier; Gaston Doumergue; Pierre-Étienne Flandin
- Minister of War: Louis Barthou; André Maginot; Charles Dumont (as interim); André Tardieu; François Piétri; Joseph Paul-Boncour; Édouard Daladier; Jean Fabry; Joseph Paul-Boncour; Philippe Pétain; Louis Maurin
- Preceded by: Philippe Pétain
- Succeeded by: Maurice Gamelin

Personal details
- Born: 21 January 1867 Brussels, Belgium (alleged)
- Died: 28 January 1965 (aged 98) Paris, France
- Spouse: Marie-Renée-Joséphine de Forsanz (m. 1900)
- Children: 2
- Education: École Spéciale Militaire

Military service
- Allegiance: Third Republic; Vichy France
- Branch/service: French Army: Cavalry
- Years of service: 1887–1942
- Rank: Army general
- Battles/wars: List: First World War; Polish–Soviet War; Second World War; Battle of France

Maxime Weygand (French: [maksim vɛɡɑ̃]; 21 January 1867 – 28 January 1965) was a French military commander in World War I and World War II, as well as a high-ranking member of the Vichy regime.

Born in Belgium, Weygand was raised in France and educated at the Saint-Cyr military academy in Paris. After graduating in 1887, he went on to become an instructor at the Saumur Cavalry School. During World War I, Weygand served as a staff officer to General (later Marshal) Ferdinand Foch. He then served as an advisor to Poland in the Polish–Soviet War and later High Commissioner of the Levant. In 1931, Weygand was appointed Chief of Staff of the French Army, a position he served until his retirement in 1935 at the age of 68.

In May 1940, without any experience in a field command leading troops in battle, Weygand was recalled for active duty and assumed command of the French Army during the German invasion. Following a series of military setbacks, Weygand advised armistice and France subsequently capitulated. He joined Philippe Pétain's Vichy regime as Minister for Defence and served until September 1940, when he was appointed Delegate-General in French North Africa. He was noted for exceptionally harsh implementation of German antisemitic policies while in this position. Despite this, Weygand favoured only limited collaboration with Germany and was dismissed from his post in November 1941 on Adolf Hitler's demand. Following the Allied invasion of North Africa in November 1942, Weygand was arrested by the Germans and imprisoned at Itter Castle in Austria until May 1945. After returning to France, he was held as a collaborator at the Val-de-Grâce but was released in 1946 and cleared of charges in 1948. He died in January 1965 in Paris at the age of 98.

== Early years ==
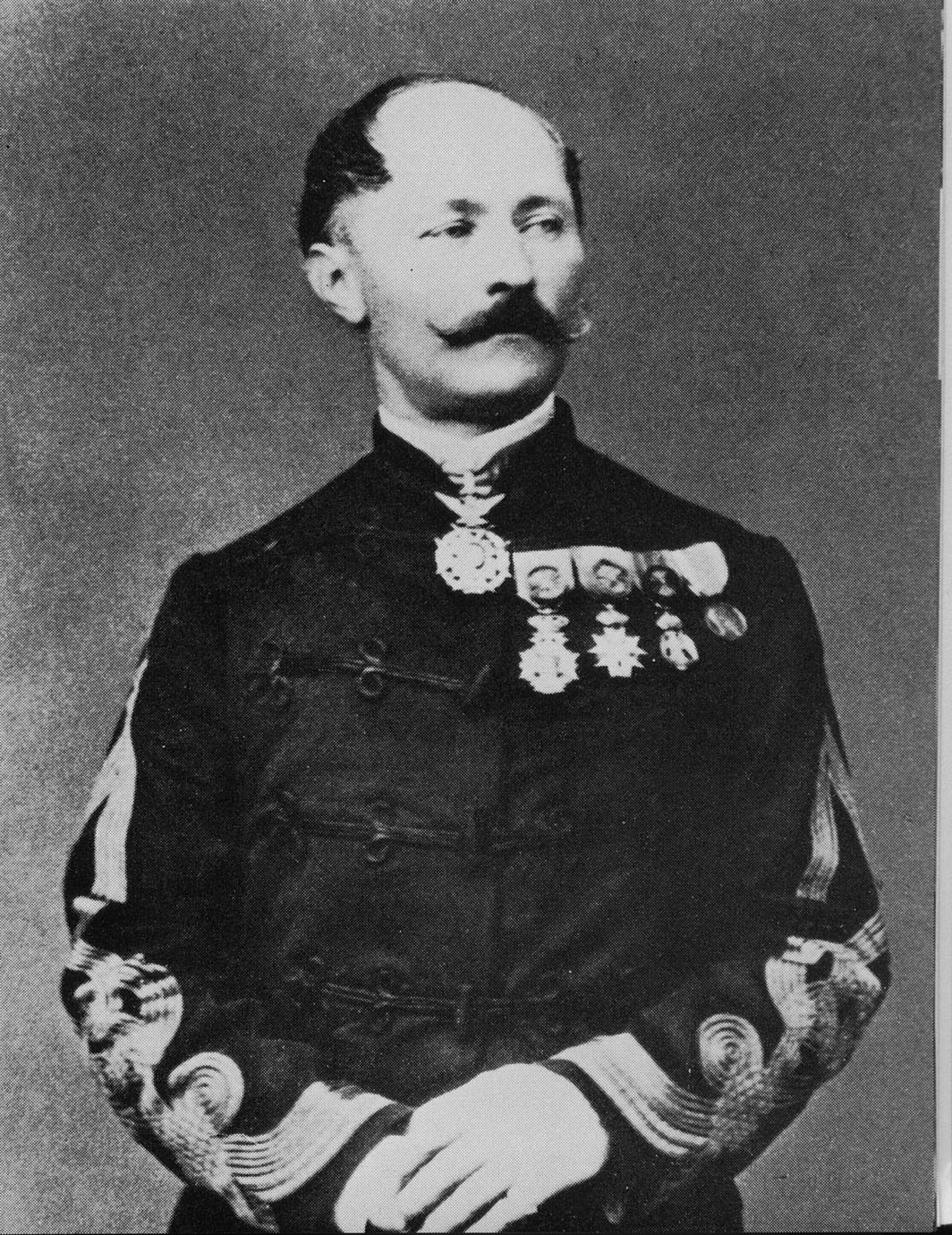
Alfred van der Smissen (1823–1895), Weygand's purported biological father

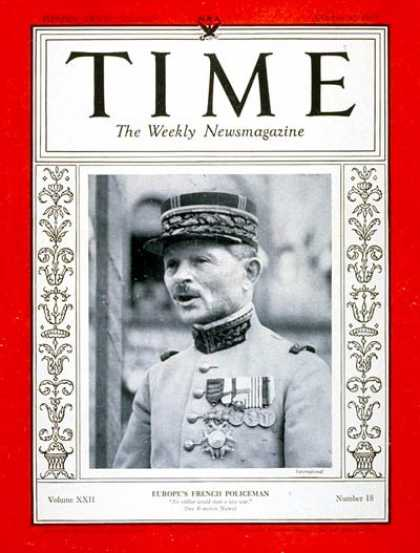
Weygand on Time magazine in 1933

Weygand was born on 21 January 1867, allegedly at 39 Boulevard de Waterloo in Brussels, of unknown parents. The biographer Bernard Destremau gave five possible sets of parents: Leopold II with either the wife of the Austrian diplomat Count Zichy or an anonymous Mexican woman (dismissed as doubtful); Charlotte, wife of then-Archduke Maximilian of Austria, and the Belgian officer Alfred van der Smissen (the most widely supported); a tutor named David Cohen and a French woman named Thérèse Denimal ("lacks credibility"); Charlotte and a Mexican Colonel Lopez ("difficult to hide"); and Maximilian of Austria and a Mexican dancer called Lupe. The various theories of Mexican extraction, however, require some kind of record forgery; regardless, Weygand's short stature and appearance may suggest a partially-European antecedence with a connection to the Austrian court suggested by the funds provided for his education in youth. In 2003, the French journalist Dominique Paoli claimed to have found evidence that Weygand's father was indeed van der Smissen, but the mother was Melanie Metternich-Zichy, lady-in-waiting to Charlotte and daughter of Klemens von Metternich. Paoli further claimed that Weygand had been born in mid-1865, not January 1867 as is generally claimed. This theory is rejected by historians as most accounts place Metternich-Zichy in European circles, not Mexico, at the time Weygand was conceived.

Regardless, throughout his life, Weygand maintained he did not know his true parentage. While an infant he was sent to Marseille to be raised by a widow named Virginie Saget, whom he originally took to be his mother. At the age of seven, he was transferred to the household of David Cohen, an Italo-Belgian leather merchant in Marseille, with partner Thérèse Denimal (later de Nimal). Then-called Maxime de Nimal, he attended schools in Cannes and then Asniéres, fees likely paid by the Belgian royal household or government, where his scholastic accomplishment were recognised. He was transferred to a boarding school in Paris and thence to the Lycée Louis-le-Grand where Maxime was baptised Catholic. After a disciplinary issue he was expelled and barred from Parisian schools, ending up at schools in Toulon and then Aix-en-Provence. Returning to Paris some years later, he was rejected from the French Navy and decided to seek admission to the École spéciale militaire de Saint-Cyr. Admitted in the top half of the class, he was denied a full French uniform due to his unclear heritage, but the slight ignored he graduated in the top ten of his class. Highly competent at fencing and horsemanship, he was accepted as a junior cavalry officer at Saumur – connecting him to a network of upper-class officers – but again rejected as a non-citizen. After some payments by David Cohen, Maxime was adopted by an accountant in Arras called Francis-Joseph Weygand. Taking the name Maxime Weygand, he was posted to a French cavalry regiment in October 1888.

He says little about his youth in his memoirs, devoting to it only four pages out of 651. He mentions the gouvernante and the aumônier of his college, who instilled in him a strong Catholic faith. His memoirs essentially begin with his entry into the preparatory class of Saint-Cyr Military School in Paris.

== Military career ==
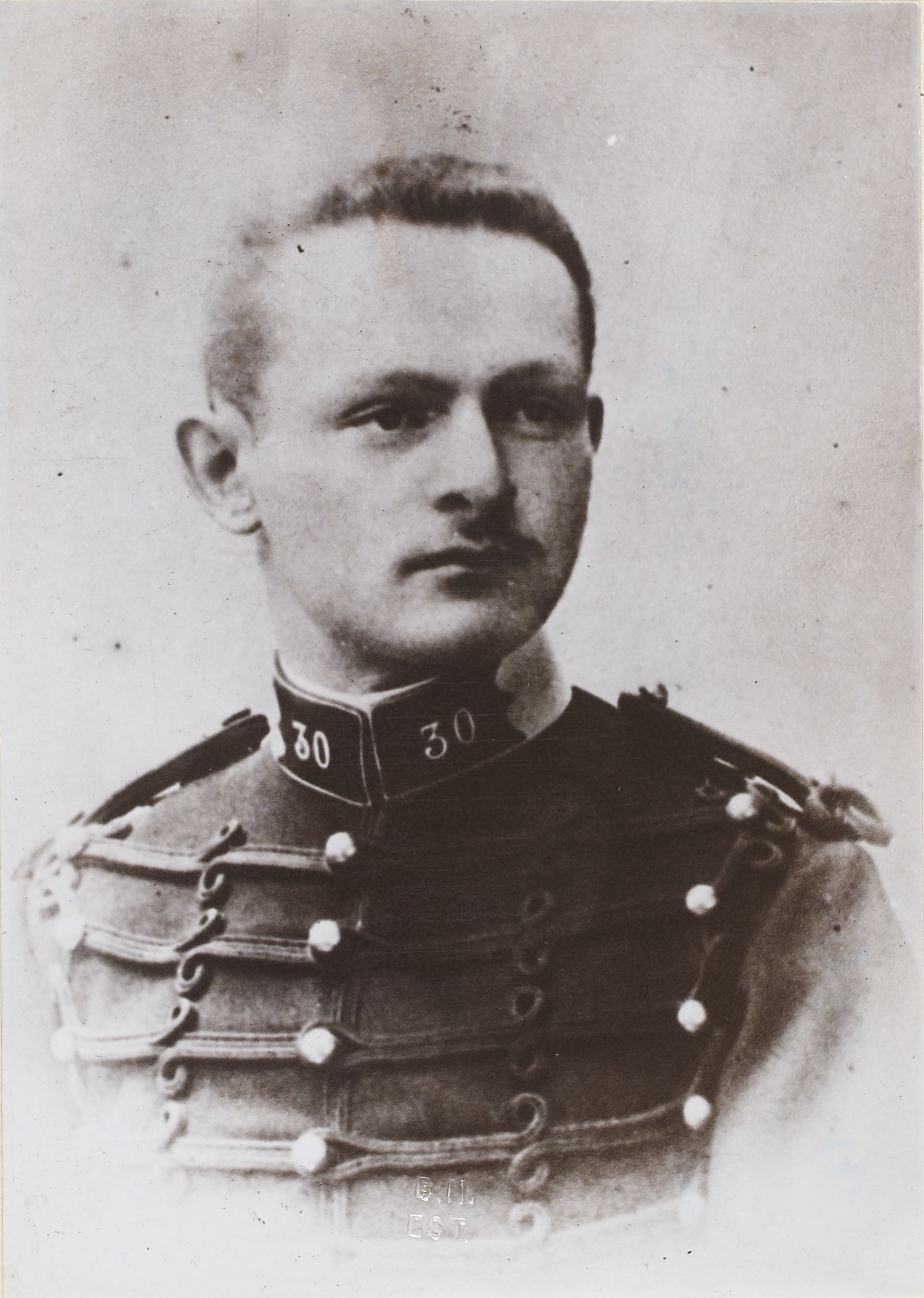
Weygand as a junior officer in the early 1890s

During the Dreyfus affair, Weygand was one of the most anti-Dreyfusard officers of his regiment, supporting the widow of Colonel Hubert-Joseph Henry, who had committed suicide after the discovery of the falsification of the charges against Captain Alfred Dreyfus.

He was promoted to captain in 1896. Weygand chose not to attempt the difficult preparation to the École Supérieure de Guerre (the French staff college) because of his desire, he said, to keep contact with the troops. This did not prevent him from later becoming an instructor at the cavalry school at Saumur. Along with Joseph Joffre and Ferdinand Foch, Weygand attended the Imperial Russian Army manoeuvres in 1910; his account mentions a great deal of pomp and many gala dinners, but also records Russian reluctance to discuss military details. Promoted with unusual rapidity to lieutenant colonel in 1912, he attended in 1913 the Centre des Hautes Etudes Militaires, set up in January 1911 to teach combined arms operations and staff work, despite not having been "breveté" (passed staff college). During his studies, he was noticed for his brilliance in staff work by Joffre and Foch. Weygand attended the last pre-war French grand manoeuvres in 1913 and commented that it had revealed "intolerable insufficiencies" such as two divisions becoming mixed up.

== First World War ==
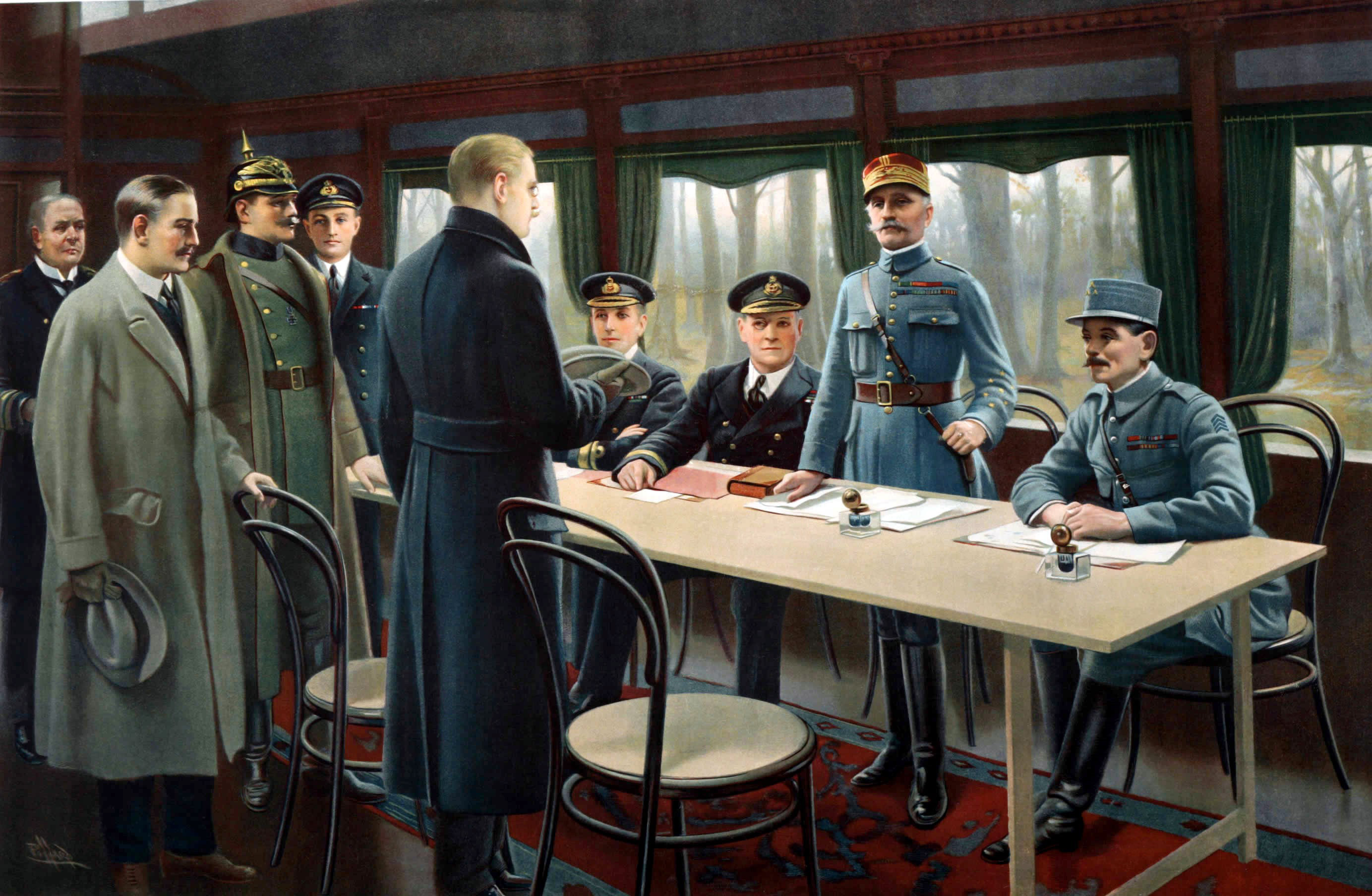
Painting by Maurice Pillard Verneuil, depicting the signing of the Armistice. Weygand is first on the right, Foch standing in the centre.

=== Early war ===
At the outbreak of the war, he was posted as a staff officer with the 5ème Hussars. His regiment was deployed to the Franco-German border on 28 July 1914 and later fought at the Battle of Morhange. On 17 August, he became chief of staff to Ferdinand Foch, the commander of the new Ninth Army. Weygand served under Foch for much of the rest of the war.

The professional partnership between Foch and Weygand was close and fruitful, with Weygand operating as a highly competent subordinate able to translate Foch's instructions into clearer orders, analyse ideas, and collate information. Foch referred to Weygand with praise, believing that their views were practically identical. Weygand finalised the plans for the 9th Army's attack at the First Battle of the Marne and, in doing so, became one of the first staff officers to reconnoitre the battlefield from the air. Weygand supported Foch, who was appointed to coordinate the Belgian, British, and French forces in the northern sector, during the Race to the Sea and First Ypres. Weygand was promoted to full colonel in early 1915.

The mounting French casualties over the course of 1915 were reflected in Weygand's campaign notes; the need for further cooperation between French and British armies utilised Weygand's communicative skills and he developed a working relationship with some British counterparts. Weygand was promoted to général de brigade in 1916. He later wrote of the Anglo-French Somme Offensive in 1916, at which Foch commanded French Army Group North, that it had seen "constant mix-ups with an ally [the British] learning how to run a large operation and whose doctrines and methods were not yet in accordance with ours". At a meeting on 3 July 1916 where Joffre and Haig came to non-speaking terms, Weygand, Foch, and Henry Wilson were able to restore a working relationship between the armies. He also took effective command of the army group as alternate when Foch was in ill health; during tensions between Foch and subordinates, Weygand helped to mediate disputes.

After Joffre was replaced by Robert Nivelle in late 1916, criticism of Foch also intensified, leading to Foch being relieved of his northern command; Weygand saw the politician's treatment of Foch as intolerable. At Foch's suggestion, Weygand's name was submitted for command of an infantry brigade, but after Foch was assigned out of inactivity to instead create a contingency plan for a German invasion of France via Switzerland, Weygand decided to stay with Foch. As part of this planning, Weygand served as head of a mission to Switzerland to discuss Anglo-French support if Switzerland were breached by German troops. Weygand later accompanied the British Chief of the Imperial General Staff, General Sir William Robertson, on an inspection of the Italian front in early 1917 to discuss Anglo-French support for Italy's Isonzo campaign. When Weygand and Foch were briefed on the Nivelle offensive, the two men expressed misgivings. After its failure, Nivelle was removed as French commander-in-chief and replaced with Philippe Pétain. Foch was appointed chief of the army general staff on 19 May 1917; writing to his wife, Weygand expressed his loyalty to Foch and gave up his applications for a field command.

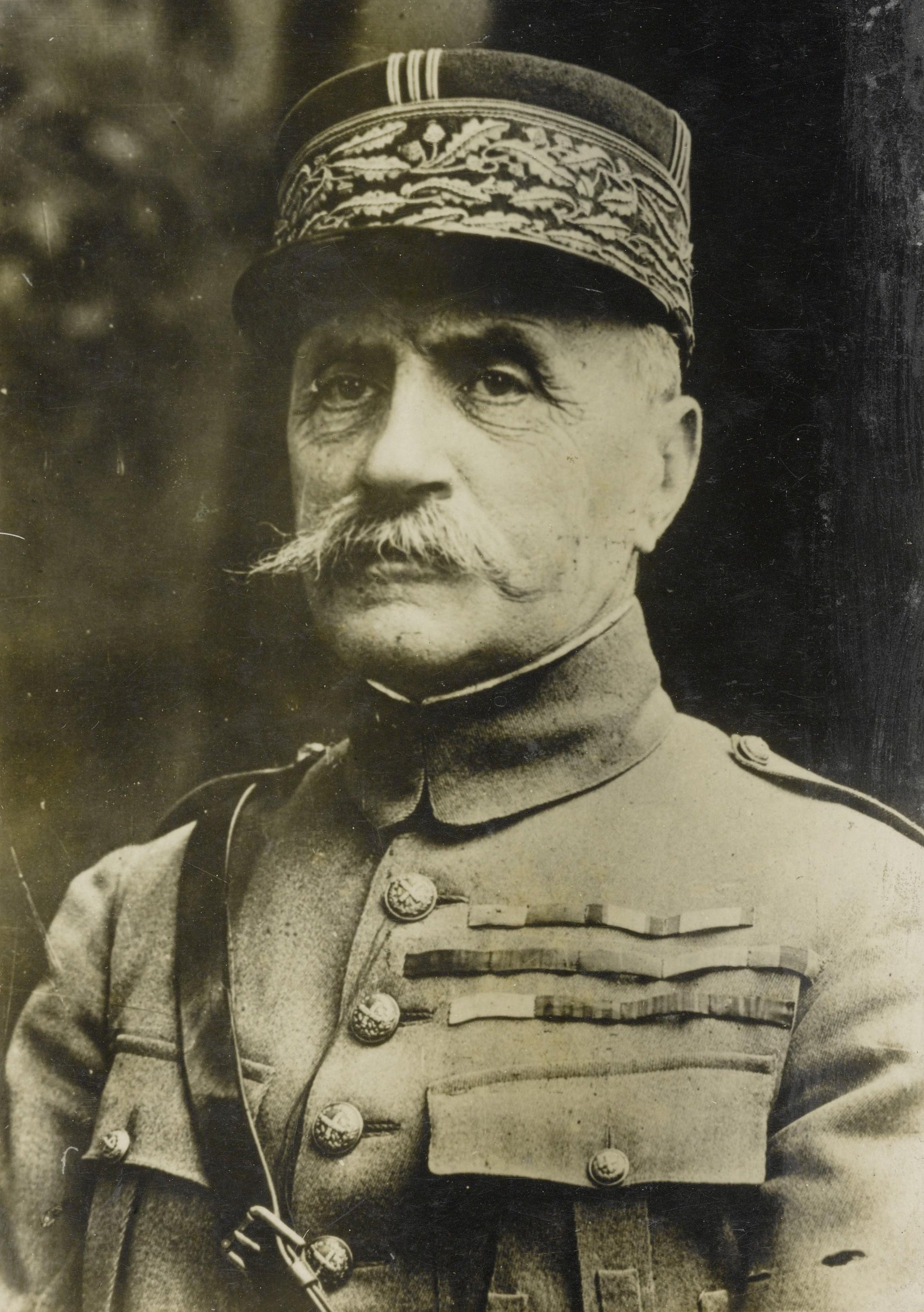
For much of the war, Weygand served under Ferdinand Foch (pictured) as a staff officer. Foch was promoted in 1918 to generalissimo of Entente forces, with Weygand as his chief of staff.

=== Supreme War Council ===
British prime minister David Lloyd George pushed for the creation of a Supreme War Council, which was formally established on 7 November 1917. Keen to sideline the British Chief of the Imperial General Staff, General William Robertson, he insisted that, as French Army chief of the General Staff, Foch could not also be French permanent military representative (PMR) on the SWC. Paul Painlevé, French prime minister until 13 November, believed that Lloyd George was already pushing for Foch to be Supreme Allied Commander so wanted him as PMR not French Chief of Staff.

The new prime minister, Georges Clemenceau, wanted Foch as PMR to increase French control over the Western Front, but was persuaded to appoint Weygand, seen very much as Foch's sidekick, instead. Clemenceau told US President Woodrow Wilson's envoy, Colonel Edward M. House that he would put in a "second- or third-rate man" as PMR and "let the thing drift where it will".

Weygand was the most junior of the PMRs (the others being the Italian Luigi Cadorna, the American Tasker H. Bliss, and the British Henry Wilson, later replaced by Henry Rawlinson). He was promoted général de division (equivalent to the Anglophone rank of major general) in 1918. This promotion was specifically because of his appointment as a PMR.

However, Clemenceau only agreed to set up an Allied General Reserve if Foch rather than Weygand were earmarked to command it. The Reserve was shelved for the time being at a SWC Meeting in London (14–15 March 1918) as the national commanders in chief, Philippe Pétain and Sir Douglas Haig, were reluctant to release divisions.

=== Supreme Allied Command Staff ===
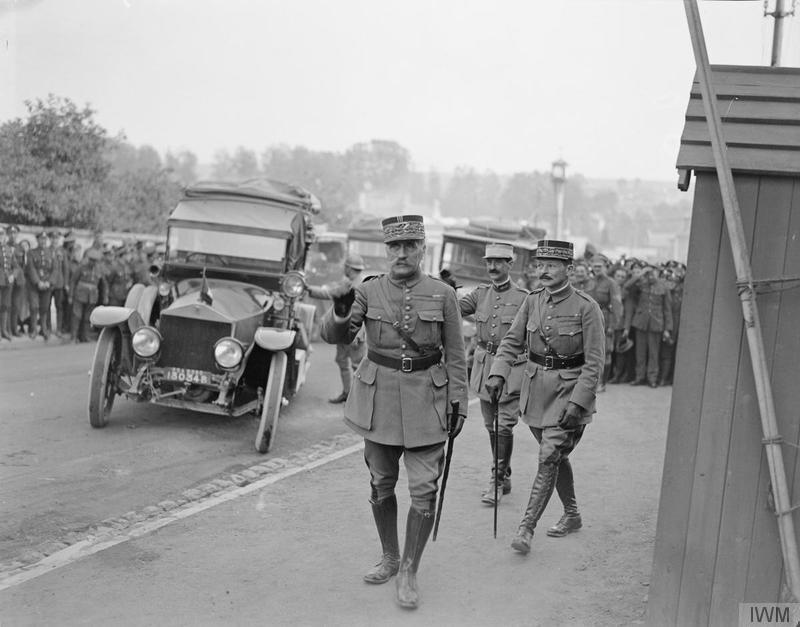
Foch and Weygand arriving at British Fourth Army Headquarters on 12 August 1918 to meet King George V.

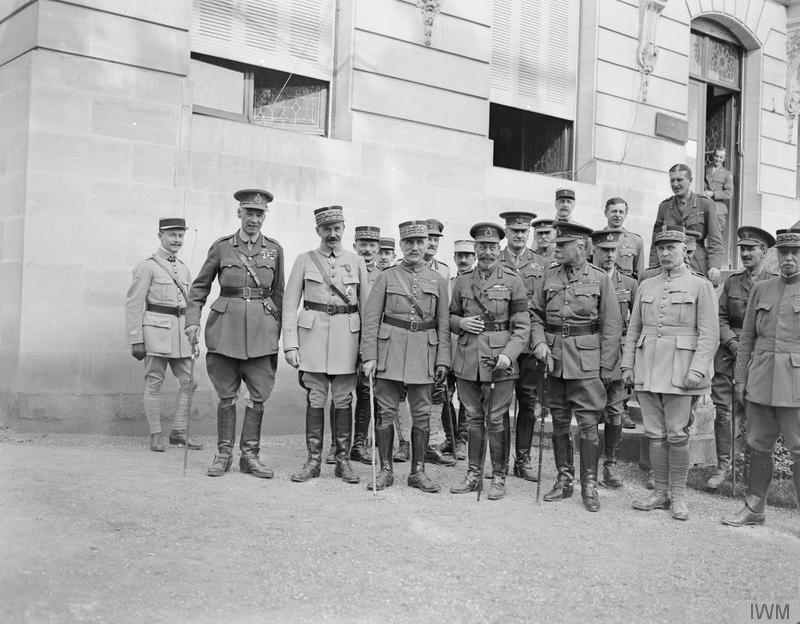
Group of senior British and French officers at General Sir Henry Rawlinson's British Fourth Army HQ at Flixecourt, France, during King George V's visit, 12 August 1918. Rawlinson is standing on the extreme left in the front row, next to Général de division Maxime Weygand, with Foch on Weygand's left.

Weygand was in charge of Foch's staff when his patron was appointed Supreme Allied Commander in the spring of 1918, and was Foch's right-hand man throughout his victories in the late summer and until the end of the war.

Weygand initially headed a small staff of 25–30 officers, with Brigadier General Pierre Desticker as his deputy. There was a separate head for each of the departments, e.g. Operations, Intelligence, Q (Quartermaster). From June 1918 onwards, under British pressure, Foch and Weygand poached staff officers from the French Commander-in-Chief Philippe Pétain (Lloyd George's tentative suggestion of a multinational Allied staff was vetoed by President Wilson). By early August Colonel Payot (responsible for supply and transport) had moved to Foch's HQ, as had the Military Missions from the other Allied HQs; in Greenhalgh's words this "put real as opposed to nominal power into Foch's hands". From early July onwards, British military and political leaders came to regret Foch's increased power, but Weygand later recorded that they had only themselves to blame as they had pushed for the change.

Like Foch and most French leaders of his era (Clemenceau, who had lived in the US as a young man, was a rare exception), Weygand could not speak enough English to "sustain a conversation" (German, not English, was the most common second language in which French officers were qualified). Competent interpreters were therefore vital.

Weygand drew up the memorandum for the meeting of Foch with the national commanders-in-chief (Haig, Pétain and John J. Pershing) on 24 July 1918, the only such meeting before the autumn, in which Foch urged (successfully) the liberation of the Marne salient captured by the Germans in May (this offensive would become the Second Battle of the Marne, for which Foch was promoted Marshal of France), along with further offensives by the British and by the Americans at St Mihiel. Weygand personally delivered the directive for the Amiens attack to Haig. Foch and Weygand were shown around the liberated St. Mihiel sector by Pershing on 20 September.

Weygand later (in 1922) questioned whether Pétain's planned offensive by twenty-five divisions in Lorraine in November 1918 could have been supplied through a "zone of destruction" through which the Germans were retreating; his own and Foch's doubts about the feasibility of the plans were another factor in the seeking of an armistice. In 1918 Weygand served on the armistice negotiations, and it was Weygand who read out the armistice conditions to the Germans at Compiègne, in the railway carriage. He can be spotted in photographs of the armistice delegates, and also standing behind Foch's shoulder at Pétain's investiture as Marshal of France at the end of 1918.

=== Paris Peace Conference ===
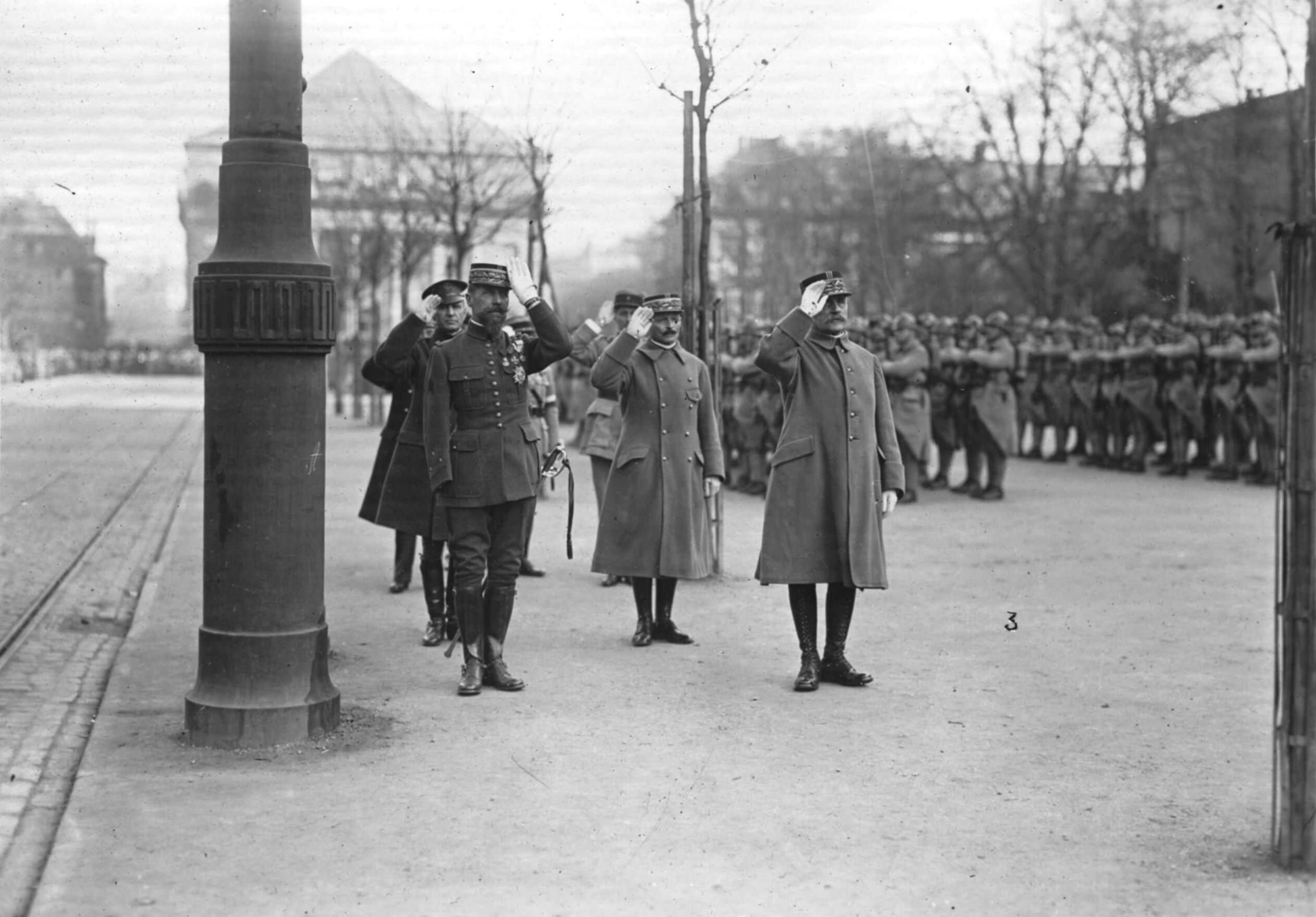
Marshal Foch with Generals Weygand and Gouraud at the Place Broglie on 21 November 1920

Weygand agreed with Foch that French security – the consequences of which were impressed during a tour of the liberated German-occupied zones in late 1918 – required territorial expansion to the River Rhine as a buffer zone. Their dislike of politicians, who they viewed as having little understanding of war realities or military issues, intensified when the French political class ruled out creating a French client state in the Rhineland. They similarly agreed that the then-proposed League of Nations would do little to ensure peace and that the planned alliances between France, Britain, and the United States would be insufficient to guarantee French security.

Foch's untactful expression of his views unnerved the Big Four civilian leaders at the peace conference: American president Woodrow Wilson, British prime minister David Lloyd George, French president Georges Clemenceau, and Italian prime minister Vittorio Emanuele Orlando. Weygand harboured similar disdain, calling them in a diary "the four old men". Because of Foch's popularity as victor of the war, he could not be easily criticised. Attacks therefore fell on Weygand who was conspiratorially accused, by among others Woodrow Wilson and Lloyd George, as driving Foch's radical positions.

== Interwar ==
=== Poland ===
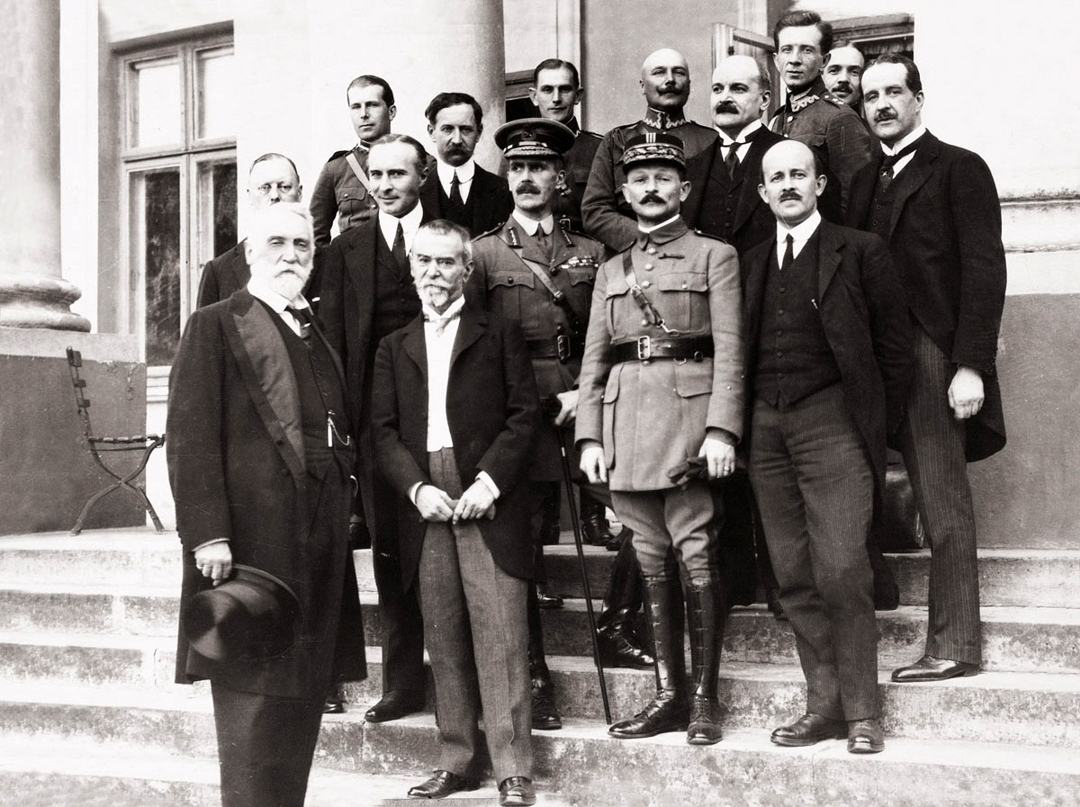
Weygand, first row second from right, standing next to British Cabinet Secretary Maurice Hankey, serving as part of the Interallied Mission to Poland. August 1920.

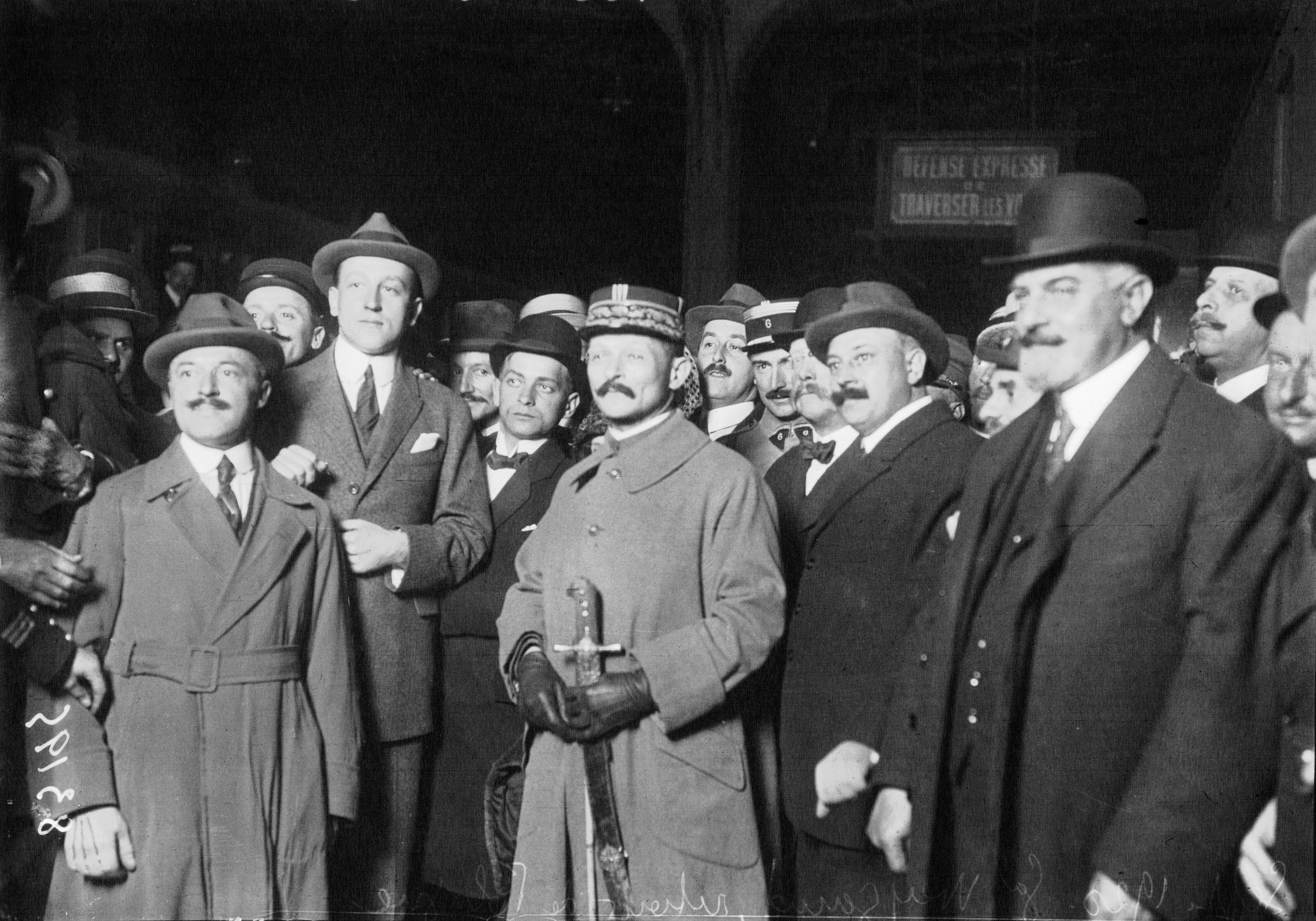
Weygand at Gare de l'Est on his return from Poland in August 1920

During the Polish–Soviet War, Weygand was a member of the Interallied Mission to Poland of July and August 1920, supporting the infant Second Polish Republic against the Russian Soviet Federative Socialist Republic. (He had not been on the 1919 French Military Mission to Poland headed by General Paul Prosper Henrys.) The Interallied Mission, which also included French diplomat Jean Jules Jusserand and the British diplomat Lord Edgar Vincent D'Abernon, achieved little: its report was submitted after the Polish Armed Forces had won the crucial Battle of Warsaw. Nonetheless, the presence of the Allied missions in Poland gave rise to a myth that the timely arrival of Allied forces saved Poland.

Weygand travelled to Warsaw expecting to assume command of the Polish army, yet those expectations were quickly dashed. He had no good reply for Józef Piłsudski, who on 24 July during their first meeting asked "How many divisions do you bring?" Weygand had none to offer. From 27 July Weygand was an adviser to the Polish Chief of Staff, Tadeusz Rozwadowski. It was a difficult position; most Polish officers regarded him as an interloper, and spoke only Polish, which he did not understand. At the end of July he proposed that the Poles hold the length of the Bug River; a week later he proposed a purely defensive posture along the Vistula river; both plans were rejected. One of his few lasting contributions was to insist on replacing the existing system of spoken orders by written documents; he also provided advice on logistics and construction of modern entrenchments. Norman Davies writes: "on the whole he was quite out of his element, a man trained to give orders yet placed among people without the inclination to obey, a proponent of defence in the company of enthusiasts for the attack". During another meeting with Piłsudski on 18 August, Weygand became offended and threatened to leave, depressed by his failure and dismayed by Poland's disregard for the Allied powers.

At the station at Warsaw on 25 August he was consoled by the award of the Virtuti Militari, 2nd class; at Paris on the 28th he was cheered by crowds lining the platform of the Gare de l'Est, kissed on both cheeks by the premier, Alexandre Millerand. Promoted to général corps d'armée and advanced to Commandeur in the Legion of Honour, Weygand could not understand what had happened and admitted in his memoirs what he said to a French journalist already on 21 August 1920: "the victory was Polish, the plan was Polish, the army was Polish". As Norman Davies notes: "He was the first uncomprehending victim, as well as the chief beneficiary, of a legend already in circulation that he, Weygand, was the victor of Warsaw. This legend persisted for more than forty years even in academic circles".

=== Levant and CHEM directorship ===
The French mandate in Syria was reorganised into two major divisions centred on Damascus and Aleppo, with a special district reserved for Alawites, during Weygand's tenure.

Weygand returned from Poland to his duties with the interallied council overseeing the implementation of the Versailles treaty and the renegotiation of peace with Turkey after they rejected the Treaty of Sèvres. Weygand declined to serve on a proposed French occupation force to occupy the Ruhr valley after Germany refused to meet reparation payments; he similarly refused appointment to Poland.

In 1922, the Poincaré ministry appointed Weygand High Commissioner of the Levant to govern the French mandate in Lebanon and Syria, replacing Henri Gouraud. Putting an end of Gouraud's coercive pacification campaigns, Weygand was largely conciliatory and devolved most policing responsibilities to local gendarmes. He also supervised infrastructure projects to support export of cotton and silk, reformed the school system, and established Damascus University in June 1923. Administration in the mandate was also reformed and the basis for the modern borders of Syria and Lebanon established. Weygand's wife Renée joined him there and they enjoyed their time in Beirut. However, with the left-wing victory in the May 1924 elections, Weygand was recalled in place of Maurice Sarrail that December.

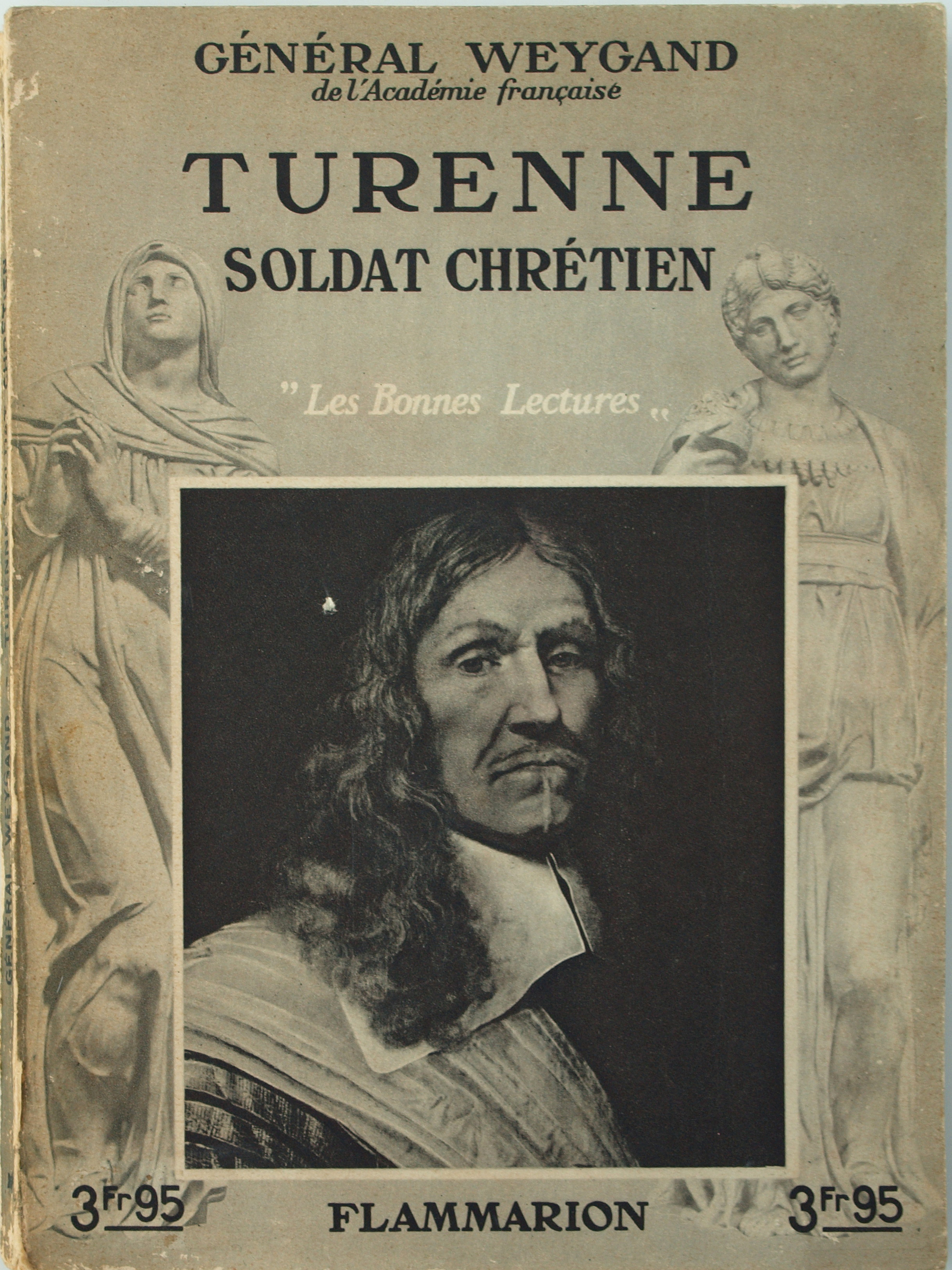
A cover of Weygand's biography of Turenne, pictured above. The book was first published in 1929.

Weygand returned to France in 1925 embittered, seeing his recall as the product of political machinations and intra-army rivalries. Regardless, he was awarded the Grand Cross of the Legion of Honor. Denied command in Morocco against the Rif War out of fear for his success, command in Syria since it would embarrass the government, and command in Germany due to his closeness with Foch, he was made director of the Centre de Hautes Etudes Militaries (Center for Higher Military Studies) from 1925 to 1930. While Weygand supported development of a doctrine of rapid armoured assault with close air support, the government's view – which feared professionalisation of the army as a threat to regime stability and saw investment in tanks as financially ruinous – prevailed. The further programme to shorten conscripts' service was voted through in the late 1920s to Weygand's disapproval: he feared that the left was intending to replace the professional army with a purely defensive national guard while drowning units in basic training, making it impossible to train for large unit operations. Settling at Morlaix in Brittany near Foch, the five years at the Centre also gave him time to write two books, biographies of French marshals Foch and Turenne.

=== Head of the army ===
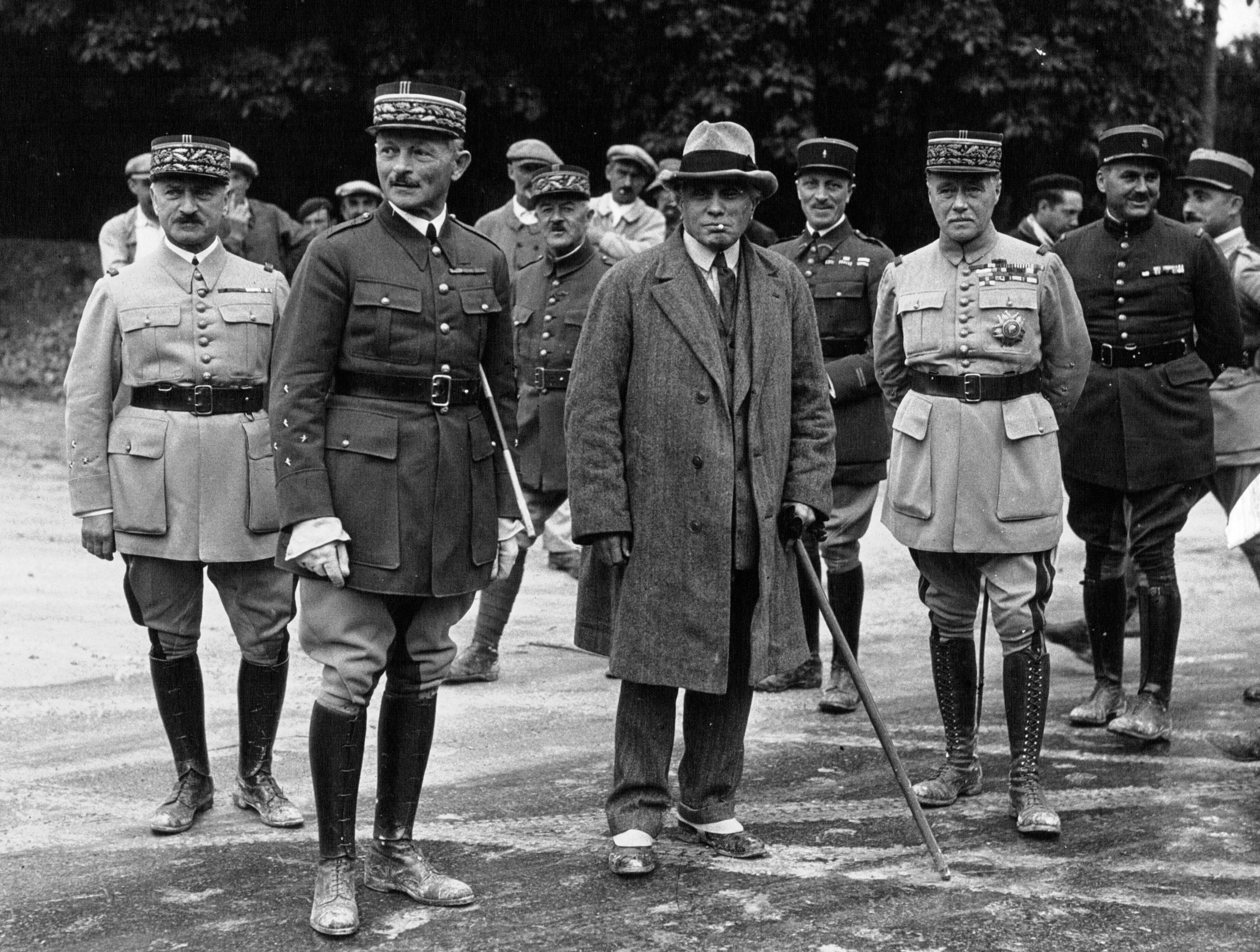
Weygand, second from left, with Gamelin, on right, in 1932.

The opening of the question of succession as chief of the general staff from 1927 placed Weygand again in the spotlight: Foch, for his part, supported his protégé and made his views clear before his death in 1929. The left-wing war minister Paul Painlevé supported Louis Maurin. But after Pétain's announced his support for Weygand and buttressed it with the recommendation that Weygand should be further appointed inspector-general on Pétain's retirement (designating Weygand as commander-in-chief on mobilisation), the topic of the appointment became thoroughly politicised. The end of Briand's government in November 1929 led to a right-wing government under André Tardieu until February 1930 that made André Maginot war minister. Attacked as a right-wing Catholic cavalry officer with aristocratic haughtiness and designs against the Third Republic with profligate plans for military expenditure in a time of austerity, Weygand was forced to disavow in a statement to Parliament any political activities and affirm his loyalty to the republican regime. The eventual compromise saw Weygand made chief of staff with the more politically safe Maurice Gamelin as deputy; Weygand was appointed chief of staff on 3 January 1930 at the age of 63. On Pétain's retirement to the post of air defence inspector on 10 February 1931, Weygand took up the vice presidency of the Conseil supérieur de la guerre as well as inspector-general of the army; Gamelin was appointed chief of staff in his place.

Weygand remained as vice president of the Conseil until his mandatory retirement at the age of 68 in February 1935. During his years in charge of the military, he attempted to push for military modernisation and increased service requirements to match the threat posed by Germany. However, the Great Depression came with substantial political instability, including street violence, and fourteen prime ministers between January 1930 and 1935. Attempts to broker international disarmament agreements were collapsed and the politicians were unwilling in depressed economic conditions to invest in new equipment or expand military pay. Amid the breakdown in French civil-military relations in the 1930s, Weygand was neutral and "never indicated any support for any such projects" to replace the republican system with a military dictatorship. He was, however, able to successfully lobby for creation of a light mechanised division as well as creation of a seven motorised infantry division in the early 1930s; he was also able to lobby for extension of conscripts' service to two years in 1934.

=== Retirement and return to the Levant ===
From 1931 he had been admitted to the Académie Française as Seat 35 in place of Joffre, deceased. On his retirement he was retained on the active list at full pay but was unassigned. This allowed him leave to travel: as an administrator of the Suez Canal Company he visited Egypt and the court of Fuad I; he travelled also to eastern Europe and Britain on military matters. He spent some of this time writing articles in military journals on the state of the army, arguing that the now-superior German army could be held back by a well-equipped defence before motorised units would be eventually able to start a counteroffensive. However, he disagreed with Charles de Gaulle's arguments for a centralised armour force on the grounds that it would undermine troop cohesion and greatly stress French industrial capacity. While he never criticised his successor Gamelin, he published a short book La france, est-elle défendue? [France, is it defended?] in 1937 warning of German military superiority and the possibility of a sudden attack. His thoughts in the years before Hitler's invasion of Poland saw him again press for further material rearmament even as his views on the need for a fully-professional army softened; he also wrote a book called Histoire de l'armée française in 1938 arguing against the prevailing defensive strategy and expressing fear over the reliability of colonial troops in metropolitan France.

Weygand was recalled for active service in August 1939 by Édouard Daladier's government and appointed again to the Levant, resigning his position in the Suez Canal Company. The government may have sought to keep him away from Gamelin's command. Regardless, he was officially dispatched to negotiate with Turkey, Greece, and Romania for French security interests. He also was tasked with inspecting and training the colonial garrisons.

== Second World War ==
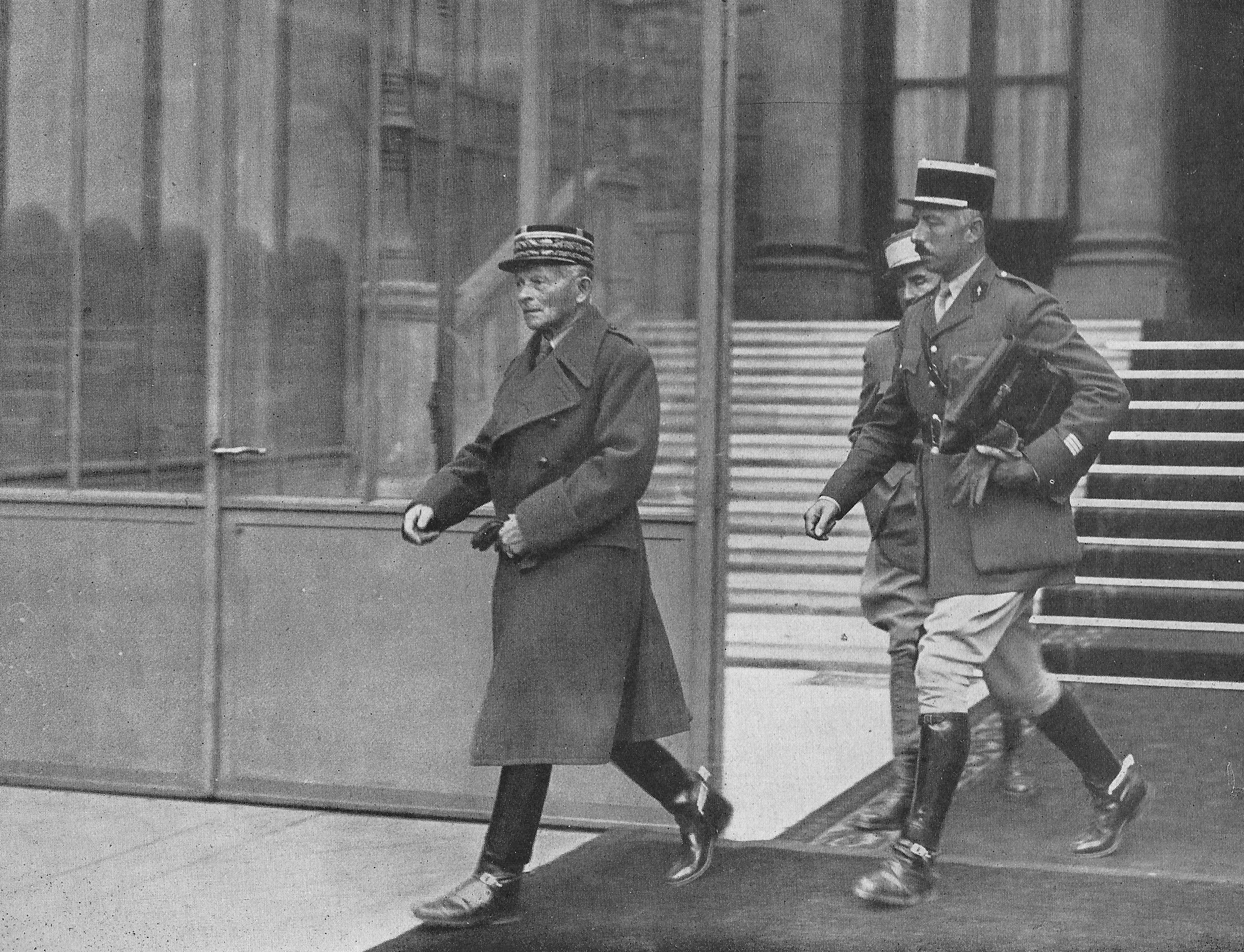
Weygand, leaving the Élysée Palace in May 1940 after being named commander-in-chief of French forces

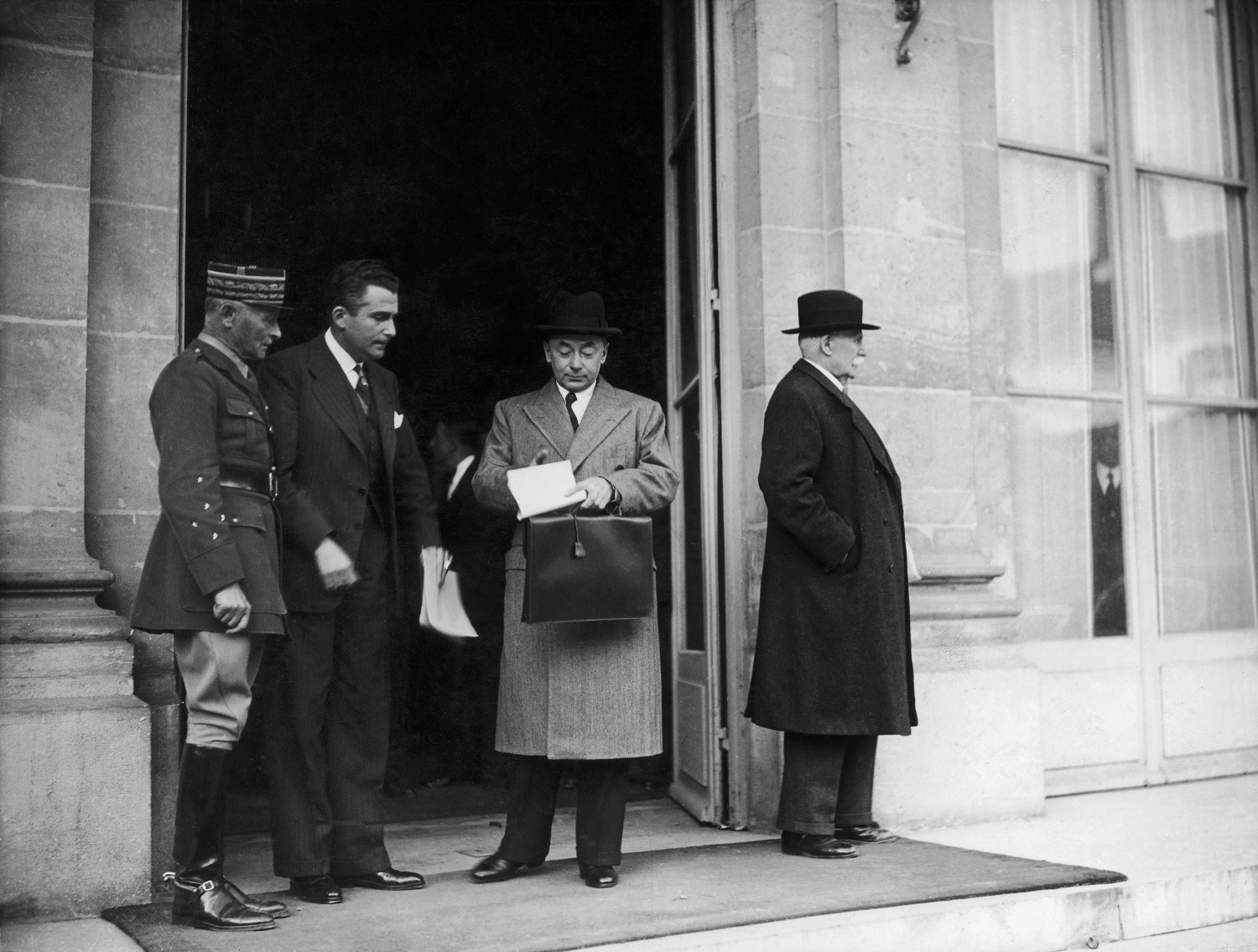
Weygand, foreign minister Paul Baudouin, prime minister Paul Reynaud, and deputy prime minister Philippe Pétain leaving a meeting of the Council of Ministers on 21 May 1940. On Weygand's right sleeve are the five stars of a général d'armée.

Immediately after the German army arrived in France, Weygand feared a Paris Commune-like event might happen.

Weygand's service during the Second World War is controversial and debated. His reputation came under substantial criticism from Charles de Gaulle and his allies after the war. Much of this criticism related to claims that Weygand was negligent in rearming France while head of the army, was defeatist or incompetent during the Battle of France thereby leading to France's defeat in 1940, and was a German collaborator in the Vichy regime.

=== Recall to service ===
By late May 1940 the military disaster in France after the German invasion was such that the Supreme Commander—and political neutral—Maurice Gamelin, was dismissed, and Weygand—a figurehead of the right—was recalled from Syria to replace him.

Weygand arrived on 17 May and started by cancelling the flank counter-offensive ordered by Gamelin, to cut off the enemy armoured columns which had punched through the French front at the Ardennes. Thus he lost two crucial days before finally adopting the solution, however obvious, of his predecessor. But it was by then a failed manoeuvre, because during the 48 lost hours, the German Army infantry had caught up behind their tanks in the breakthrough and had consolidated their gains.

Weygand then oversaw the creation of the Weygand Line, an early application of the hedgehog tactic; however, by this point the situation was untenable, with most of the Allied forces trapped in Belgium. Weygand complained that he had been summoned two weeks too late to halt the invasion.

=== Armistice ===
On 5 June the German second offensive (Fall Rot) began. On 8 June Weygand was visited by de Gaulle, newly appointed to the government as Under-Secretary for War. According to de Gaulle's memoirs Weygand believed it was "the end" and gave a "despairing laugh" when de Gaulle suggested fighting on. He believed that after France was defeated Britain would also soon sue for peace, and hoped that after an armistice the Germans would allow him to retain enough of a French Army to "maintain order" in France. Weygand later disputed the accuracy of de Gaulle's account of this conversation, and remarked on its similarity to a dialogue by Pierre Corneille. De Gaulle's biographer Jean Lacouture suggests that de Gaulle's account is consistent with other evidence of Weygand's beliefs at the time and is therefore, allowing perhaps for a little literary embellishment, broadly plausible.

Fascist Italy entered the war and invaded France on 10 June. That day Weygand barged into the office of Prime Minister Paul Reynaud and demanded an armistice. Weygand was present at the Anglo-French Conference at the Château du Muguet at Briare on 11 June, at which the option was discussed of continuing the French war effort from Brittany or French North Africa. The transcript shows Weygand to have been somewhat less defeatist than de Gaulle's memoirs would suggest. At the Cabinet meeting on the evening of 13 June, after another Anglo-French conference at Tours, Marshal Pétain, Deputy Prime Minister, strongly supported Weygand's demand for an armistice. On June 14 Weygand warned General Alan Brooke, the new commander-in-chief of the British forces in France, that the French Army was collapsing and incapable of fighting further, leading him to evacuate the final British Expeditionary Force contingents remaining on the Western Front.

The French government moved to Bordeaux on 14 June. At Cabinet on 15 June Reynaud urged that they should follow the Dutch example, that the Army should lay down its arms so that the fight could be continued from abroad. Pétain was sympathetic, but he was sent to speak to Weygand (who was waiting outside, as he was not a member of the Cabinet). After no more than fifteen minutes Weygand persuaded him that this would be a shameful surrender. Camille Chautemps then proposed a compromise proposal, that the Germans be approached about possible armistice terms. The Cabinet voted 13–6 for the Chautemps proposal.

After Reynaud's resignation as Prime Minister on 16 June, President Albert Lebrun felt he had little choice but to appoint Pétain, who already had a ministerial team ready, as prime minister. Weygand joined the new government as Minister for Defence, and was briefly able to veto the appointment of Pierre Laval as minister of foreign affairs.

=== Vichy regime ===
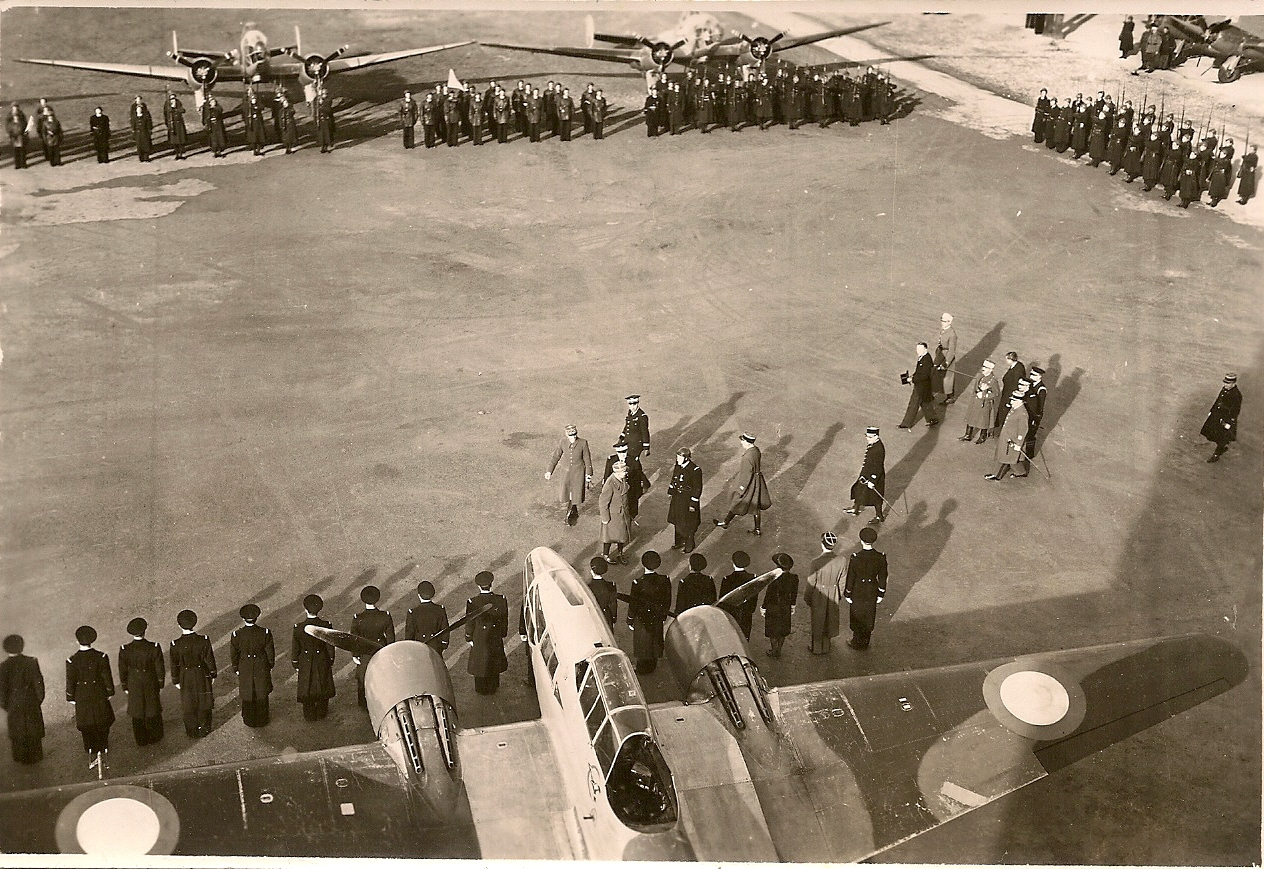
BA144 Ain-Arnat-Sétif (French Algeria): Weygand inspection 1940

The Vichy regime was set up in July 1940. Weygand continued to serve in Pétain's cabinet as Minister for National Defence until September 1940. He was then appointed Delegate-General in French North Africa.

In North Africa, he persuaded young officers, tempted to join the French Resistance against the German occupation, to go along with the armistice for the present, by letting them hope for a later resumption of combat. With the complicity of Admiral Jean-Marie Charles Abrial, he deported opponents of Vichy to concentration camps in Southern Algeria and Morocco. Those imprisoned included Gaullists, Freemasons, and Jews, and also communists, despite their obedience at the time to the Soviet Union's orders not to support the resistance. He also arrested the foreign volunteers of the Légion Etrangère, foreign refugees who were in France legally but were without employment, and others. He applied Vichy anti-Jewish legislation very harshly. With the complicity of the Recteur (University chancellor) Georges Hardy, Weygand instituted, on his own authority, by a mere "note de service" (n°343QJ of 30 September 1941), a school numerus clausus (quota). This drove out most Jewish students from the colleges and the primary schools, including children aged 5 to 11. Weygand did this without any order from Pétain, "by analogy", he said, "to the law about Higher Education".

Weygand acquired a reputation as an opponent of collaboration when he protested in Vichy against the Paris Protocols of 28 May 1941, signed by Admiral François Darlan. These agreements authorized the Axis powers to establish bases in French colonies: at Aleppo, Syria; Bizerte, Tunisia; and Dakar, Senegal. The Protocols also envisaged extensive French military collaboration with Axis forces in the event of Allied attacks against such bases. Weygand remained outspoken in his criticism of Germany.

Weygand opposed Wehrmacht bases in French territory not to help the Allies or even to keep France neutral, but rather to preserve the integrity of the French Empire and maintain prestige in the eyes of the natives. Weygand apparently favoured limited collaboration with Germany. The Weygand General Delegation (4th Office) delivered military equipment to the Panzer Armee Afrika: 1,200 French trucks and other Armistice Army vehicles (Dankworth contract of 1941), and also heavy artillery with 1,000 shells per gun. However, Adolf Hitler demanded full unconditional collaboration and pressured the Vichy government to dismiss Weygand in November 1941 and recall him from North Africa. A year later, in November 1942, following the Allied invasion of North Africa, the Germans arrested Weygand. He remained in custody in Germany and then in the Itter Castle in North Tyrol with General Gamelin and a few other French Third Republic personalities until May 1945. He was freed by United States Army troops after the Battle of Castle Itter.

== Last years ==
After returning to France, Weygand was held as a collaborator at the Val-de-Grâce but was released in May 1946 and cleared in 1948. He died on 28 January 1965 in Paris at the age of 98. He had married Marie-Renée-Joséphine de Forsanz (1876–1961), the daughter of Brigadier General Raoul de Forsanz (1845–1914), on 12 November 1900. They had two sons, Édouard (1901–1987) and Jacques (1905–1970).

Beirut still holds his name on one of its major streets, Rue Weygand.

== Decorations ==
- French Third Republic
  - Légion d'honneur
    - Knight (10 July 191?)
    - Officer (10 December 1914)
    - Commander (28 December 1918)
    - Grand Officer (1 September 1920)
    - Grand Cross (6 December 1924)
  - Médaille militaire (8 July 1930)
  - Croix de Guerre 1914–1918 with 3 palms
  - Croix de guerre des théâtres d'opérations extérieures with 1 palm
  - Médaille Interalliée de la Victoire
  - Médaille Commémorative de la Grande Guerre
  - Morocco: Grand Cross of the Ouissam Alaouite Chérifien
- French Fourth Republic
  - Croix de Guerre 1939–1945 with 2 palms
- Belgium:
  - Commander of the Order of the Crown
  - Croix de guerre
- (United Kingdom) Britain:
  - Companion of the Order of the Bath
  - Knight Commander of the Order of St Michael and St George
- Latvia: Order of Lāčplēsis, 2nd class.
- Sweden: Grand Cross of the Order of the Sword (1939)
- United States: Distinguished Service Medal
- Yugoslavia: Order of the White Eagle

== Notes ==
Military offices
Preceded by Marie-Eugène Debeney	Chief of Staff of the French Army; 2 January 1930 – 9 February 1931	Succeeded by Maurice Gamelin
Preceded by Philippe Pétain	Vice President of the Superior War Council; 9 February 1931 – 21 January 1935	Succeeded by Maurice Gamelin
Preceded by Maurice Gamelin	Commander-in-Chief of the French Army; 18 May – 11 July 1940	Succeeded by Charles Huntziger
