= Apocalypse: Hitler =

- Created by: Daniel Costelle; Isabelle Clarke
- Country of origin: France
- No. of episodes: 2

Production
- Producers: CC&C; ECPAD

Original release
- Network: France Télévisions
- Release: 25 October – 25 October 2011

Apocalypse: Hitler is a French two-part television series chronicling the rise of Adolf Hitler and the birth of Nazi ideology, broadcast on France 2 on 25 October 2011.

It brings together known or unpublished documents from the period and recounts the major events that led him to take power. Archival images have been restored and colorized. The series is directed by Isabelle Clarke and Daniel Costelle.

== Episodes ==
- The threat: It recounts the beginnings of Adolf Hitler, born 20 April 1889 in Braunau am Inn in Austria, son of a loving mother and an authoritarian father. A poor student and a failed artist, he fervently enlisted in the Bavarian infantry during the World War I. Wounded, he learns of the defeat during his convalescence. The humiliation of the Diktat is one of the sources of its exacerbated nationalism and obsessive antisemitism. He discovered that he was a gifted speaker and very quickly became the spokesperson for a small far right group, the DAP. He galvanizes the crowds by emphasizing the purity of the race. Despite the failed coup of November 1923, the publication of Mein Kampf raises his aura which still does not worry other political parties.
- The Führer: The 1929 economic crisis is an opportunity for Hitler, associated with its chief propagandist Joseph Goebbels and the SA, it causes trouble in the country's political life and is presented as the only solution to end of the people's misery. In 1932, President Hindenburg dissolved Parliament and allowed the Nazi Party to be the country's leading political force. Hitler is promoted to head of government. Despite a semblance of openness, he eliminates his political opponents and begin to pursue a policy of discrimination against the Jews, who he says are responsible for all evil. And despite having a message of peace to other nations, he prepares the Apocalypse.

== See also ==
Apocalypse: Hitler is part of the Apocalypse series of documentaries which also includes:

- Apocalypse: The Second World War
- Apocalypse: Never-Ending War 1918–1926
- Apocalypse: Stalin
- Apocalypse: Verdun
- Apocalypse: World War I
- Apocalypse: the Cold War
- Apocalypse: Hitler Takes on the West
- Apocalypse: Hitler Takes on the East
- Apocalypse: The Fall of Hitler
