= Apocalipsis (video game) =

2018 video game

- Promotional cover art
- Developer: Punch Punk Games
- Publisher: Klabater
- Platforms: Microsoft Windows; macOS; PlayStation 4; Xbox One; Nintendo Switch
- Release: February 8, 2018
- Genre: Adventure
- Mode: Single-player

Apocalipsis is a 2018 adventure game developed by Punch Punk Games and published by Klabater. The game was released for Microsoft Windows, macOS, PlayStation 4, Xbox One and Nintendo Switch on February 8, 2018.

== Reception ==
Apocalipsis received "mixed or average" reviews, according to review aggregator Metacritic.

Colin Campbell from Polygon said, "[Apocalipsis'] puzzles, its art and its atmosphere feel authentically medieval, while its story splashes in the dark waters of stoicism."

Richard Hoover from Adventure Gamers said, "A compelling if somewhat easy puzzler with a unique aesthetic inspired by medieval engravings, Apocalipsis has that melancholic appeal of a Grimm’s fairy tale on a rainy day."

Matthew Gabriele from Forbes said,

A lot of the work connecting Apocalipsis to the European Middle Ages is actually done, as I mentioned before, by its imagery. Not just the woodcut style (which is actually much closer to the era of the Reformation than high Middle Ages), but rather the backgrounds. Harry must interact with castles, torture chambers, talking skeletons, sea monsters, and perform occult rituals. All of that is what makes the game seem "medieval."

This could lead us to a dead end. Here we are with another "Dark Ages" – in the same thought world as Game of Thrones. But not so. Video games allow us to think about the past in different ways from other types of pop culture. In video games, you get to make choices.
