= Apocalypse: Stalin =

- Created by: Daniel Costelle; Isabelle Clarke
- Country of origin: France
- No. of episodes: 3

Production
- Producers: CC&C; ECPAD

Original release
- Network: France Télévisions
- Release: November 3 – November 3, 2015

Apocalypse: Stalin (in French: Apocalypse, Staline) is a French three-part television series retracing the meteoric rise of Joseph Stalin and the birth of Stalinist ideology, broadcast on France 2 on November 3, 2015. It brings together known and unpublished period documents relating the major events which led Stalin to become Secretary General of the Soviet Communist Party and to lead the Union of Soviet Socialist Republics (USSR). Archival images used in the series were restored and colorized. The series was directed by Isabelle Clarke and Daniel Costelle.

== Episodes ==
- Demon: Recounts the beginnings of Iosif Vissarionovich Dzhugashvili who became Stalin. Born in Gori, Georgia officially on December 6, 1878, he was son of a fervent Russian Orthodox mother who worked as a seamstress, and a father who made a good living as a shoemaker, but who quickly became an alcoholic. His mother pushed her son suffering from atherosclerosis to the priesthood and had difficulty financing his studies. A brilliant student, he was expelled at the age of twenty for Marxist propaganda and became a bandit in the name of the "Revolution". He was arrested and escaped on numerous occasions. During his escape in 1904, he encountered Lenin for the first time and then joined the Bolshevik faction of the Russian Social Democratic Workers' Party. In November 1917, with Lenin, he participated in the seizure of power in Russia in the context of the First World War which saw the collapse of the rule of the Emperor of Russia. Civil war is tearing the country apart. The Bolsheviks set up a regime of terror. Joseph Djougachvili stood out and, supported by Lenin, made himself indispensable: he became Stalin, "the man of steel". He is "possessed", as in the novels of Dostoyevsky, by the Marxist faith and has for his only moral: "faith is above the law". In June 1941, Hitler rushes into a war to the death against Stalin. The latter made serious mistakes which allowed the German army to initiate a lightning advance, putting the Soviet Union in danger. During the winter of 1941, the Germans were at the gates of Moscow, which could change Stalin's fate. The world is holding its breath.
- Red: After the death of Lenin, Stalin became head of the Soviet Union by using cold maneuvers punctuated by violence and intimidation. He eliminates all his opponents, starting with Trotsky who was ousted from the government in 1924, from the Communist Party in 1927, and finally exiled. The latter was opposed to the increasing bureaucratization of the regime embodied by Stalin. For a decade at the height of a totalitarian regime founded on lies, Stalin sent to the labor camps of the GULag all those whom he suspects of constituting a danger and makes them condemn. His complete lack of pity even caused the death of his eldest son, a prisoner of the Germans. During the winter of 1941, the Soviets alone faced the assault of Hitler's troops who already occupied half of Russia and attempted a breakthrough in southern Russia, towards Stalingrad. On December 14, 1941, Nazi Germany declares war on the United States. Stalin, preoccupied with a forbidden love of his daughter, waged war as in 1914–1918, sacrificing the Soviet people and sending millions of soldiers to their deaths in the endless siege of Leningrad in 1942, the black year of Russia. The German offensive crushed the Soviet troops during the winter of 1942. The Red Army, supported by American and British aid, succeeded in stopping the Army of the Reich in the East and to gain a resounding victory at Stalingrad in 1943. Stalin was already treated as an equal by his British and American allies at the Tehran Conference in 1943. He became one of the most powerful men on the planet.
- Master of the World: 15 years earlier, Stalin wants to create a new Russian society by spreading terror. Under any pretext, he arrested and deported his opponents to the gulag or had them shot. During the Moscow Trials, he had his former political rivals eliminated. By violence, he imposed on the peasants the complete collectivization of agricultural land, creating collective farms and sovkhozes and causing famine in Ukraine. He plans a heavy industrialization at forced march, building colossal dams, hundreds of kilometers of canals, giant factories and the marble columns of the Moscow Metro by convicts of the gulags. Soviet youth are closely supervised and recruited. He also established an atheism based on a materialist vision, eliminating all forms of religion and organizing incessant propaganda, ordering a cult of the personality to his glory.

== See also ==
Apocalypse: Stalin is part of the Apocalypse series of documentaries which also includes:

- Apocalypse: The Second World War
- Apocalypse: Never-Ending War 1918-1926
- Apocalypse: Hitler
- Apocalypse: Verdun
- Apocalypse: World War I
- Apocalypse: the Cold War
