= Lionel Richard =

French poet (born 1938)

Lionel Richard (born 1938) is a French poet, historian and a former professor for Cultural studies.

== Career ==
Richard is a former faculty member of the Université de Picardie Jules Verne in Amiens. His essays are regularly published by French publishing houses and periodicals such as Le Magazine littéraire, Le Monde diplomatique and 'Encyclopædia Universalis.

Since 1971, Richard mainly works on various aspects of German history of the 20th century, dedicating himself mainly to National Socialist Germany and its effects on humanity and culture. Amongst other subjects he described the Daily Life in the Weimar Republic, created the Encyclopedia of Bauhaus and featured German expressionism. A series of his essays were translated into different languages and are now points of references in their field.

He was one of the hosts of Le Panorama, a radio show on cultural affairs presented by France Culture in 1968 to 1998. In 2010, Richard for the first time named Maximilian Scheer as the before unknown author of the 1936 publication Das deutsche Volk klagt an. In this book (in English: The German People's Indictment), Scheer and his collaborators presented the cruelty of the Nazi regime in its first three years of existence and outlined precisely its intention to go to war and to murder the Jews and other groups of German society. Richard presented his findings in Le Monde diplomatique, and thereafter he wrote a foreword for the reprint of the book in 2012.

== Publications ==
=== Poems ===
- La Voix des flammes, Éditions José Millas-Martin, 1957
- Le Bois et la Cendre, Éditions Action poétique,1959
- « Orphiques », published in Marginales, February 1967, N° 112, 15-19

=== Essays and Non-fiction Books ===
- Nazisme et littérature, Éditions Maspero, 1971
- D'une apocalypse à l'autre - Sur l'Allemagne et ses productions intellectuelles de la fin du XXe siècle aux années trente, 10-18, 1976. Réédition: Somogy, 1998
- Le Nazisme et la Culture, Éditions Complexe, 1999
- Encyclopédie du Bauhaus, Somogy, 1986
- La Vie quotidienne sous la République de Weimar, Hachette, 1991
- L'Expressionnisme, Collection Petite encyclopédie, Somogy, 1993
- Cabaret, cabarets, Plon, 1991
- D’où vient Adolf Hitler ?, Autrement, 2000
- Expressionnistes allemands - Panorama bilingue d'une génération, Complexe, 2001
- L’aventure de l’art contemporain de 1945 à nos jours, Le Chêne, 2002
- De l'exotisme aux arts premiers, Éditions Le Chêne, 2004
- Arts premiers : l’évolution d’un regard, Le Chêne/Hachette, 2005
- L’art et la guerre : les artistes confrontés à la Seconde Guerre mondiale, Hachette, 2005
- Suite et séquelles de l’Allemagne nazie, Éditions Syllepse, 2005
- Nazisme et barbarie, Complexe, 2006
- Goebbels, Portrait d'un manipulateur, André Versaille éditeur, 2008
- Avant l'apocalypse : Berlin 1919-1933 , Autrement, 2013
