= Apocalypse: The Second World War =

- Created by: Daniel Costelle; Isabelle Clarke; Jean-Louis Guillaud; Henri de Turenne
- Narrated by: Mathieu Kassovitz - French; Martin Sheen - English US; Jonathan Booth - English UK
- Composer: Kenji Kawai
- Country of origin: France
- No. of episodes: 6

Production
- Producers: CC&C; ECPAD
- Running time: 5 hours 20 minutes

Original release
- Network: France 2, RTBF, TSR
- Release: 20 August – 22 September 2009

Apocalypse: The Second World War (French: Apocalypse, la 2^{e} Guerre mondiale) (2009) is a six-part French documentary by Daniel Costelle and Isabelle Clarke about the Second World War. The music of the documentary was composed by Kenji Kawai.

The documentary is composed exclusively of actual footage of the war as filmed by war correspondents, soldiers, resistance fighters and private citizens. The series is shown in color, with the black-and-white footage being fully colorized, save for some original color footage. The only exception to the treatment are most Holocaust scenes, which are presented in the original black and white.

It was first aired in 2009 from August 20 and 27 and September 3 on the French-speaking Belgian RTBF, then on August 23 and 30 and September 6 on the French-speaking Swiss TSR, and finally on September 8 to September 22 on France 2 channel. It was narrated in French by actor/director Mathieu Kassovitz. The documentary was shown on the Smithsonian Channel in the United States, where it was narrated by actor Martin Sheen, on the National Geographic Channel and Channel 4 in the United Kingdom, where it was narrated by actor Jonathan Booth, Canada, the Netherlands, Poland, Australia, Romania and Asia, on YLE Teema in Finland, on Rete 4 in Italy, on IBA, the national public channel in Israel, on RTP2, the national public channel in Portugal, and on La 2, the national public channel in Spain.

== Episodes ==
1. Aggression (1933–1939): rise of Nazism and the invasion of Poland, Phoney war
2. Crushing Defeat (1939–1940): Battle of Dunkirk and Battle of France, Battle of Britain
3. Shock (1940–1941): the North African Campaign, Invasion of Yugoslavia, Battle of Greece and Battle of Crete, Operation Barbarossa, Battle of Smolensk and Battle of Moscow
4. World Ablaze (1941–1942): Pearl Harbor, Midway and Guadalcanal, Operation Fall Blau
5. The Great Landings/The Noose (1942–1943): first failures of the Axis, Battle of Stalingrad, El Alamein, Operation Torch, Tunisia, Kursk and Italian campaign
6. Inferno (1944–1945): liberation of France, invasion of Germany, surrender of Germany, atomic bombing of Hiroshima and Nagasaki, and surrender of Japan

== Depictions ==
The documentary includes a series of portraits of the main leaders of World War II.

=== Germans ===
- Adolf Hitler
- Hermann Göring
- Konstantin von Neurath
- Joachim von Ribbentrop
- Rudolf Hess
- Joseph Goebbels
- Martin Bormann
- Heinrich Himmler
- Reinhard Heydrich
- Albert Speer
- Eva Braun
- Magda Goebbels
- Karl Dönitz
- Wilhelm Keitel
- Fedor von Bock
- Heinz Guderian
- Friedrich Paulus
- Erwin Rommel
- Erich von Manstein
- Walther von Brauchitsch

=== French ===
- Charles de Gaulle
- Philippe Leclerc de Hauteclocque
- Philippe Pétain
- Paul Reynaud
- Maurice Gamelin
- Maxime Weygand
- Henri Giraud
- Albert Lebrun
- Jean de Lattre de Tassigny
- Charles Huntziger
- Émile Muselier

=== British ===
- Neville Chamberlain
- Winston Churchill
- Bernard Montgomery
- Arthur Harris

=== Americans ===
- Franklin D. Roosevelt
- Dwight Eisenhower
- Douglas MacArthur
- Chester Nimitz
- George Patton
- Charles A. Lindbergh
- Henry Ford
- Joseph P. Kennedy
- John F. Kennedy
- Harry S. Truman

=== Soviets ===
- Joseph Stalin
- Vyacheslav Molotov
- Georgy Zhukov
- Lavrentiy Beria
- Semyon Timoshenko
- Nikita Khrushchev
- Andrey Vlasov

=== Italians ===
- Benito Mussolini
- Galeazzo Ciano

=== Japanese ===
- Hirohito
- Hideki Tōjō
- Tomoyuki Yamashita
- Isoroku Yamamoto

=== Chinese ===
- Chiang Kai-shek

=== Miscellaneous ===
Some of the people documented in the series:

- Rose Gowlland – A British child who was a year old when the war broke out. On the last day of the war, she painted 'The End' on a bomb.
- Gaston Sirec – A French truck driver who was imprisoned in a stalag when the Germans defeated France.
- Lt. August Graf Kageneck – A German Tank commander who personifies a typical Wehrmacht soldier as he writes in his journal or to his mother.
- While a lot of males are mentioned in this documentary series, cell block guards and nurses who were female also contributed to WWII. A novel by Elizabeth Wein displays some of this torment done in women concentration camps.

== See also ==
- Apocalypse: World War I
- Apocalypse: Hitler
- Apocalypse: Stalin
- Apocalypse: Never-Ending War 1918-1926
- Apocalypse: the Cold War
