= Apocalypse: Never-Ending War 1918–1926 =

- Created by: Daniel Costelle; Isabelle Clarke; Mickaël Gamrasni
- Countries of origin: France; Canada
- No. of episodes: 2

Production
- Producers: CC&C; ECPAD

Original release
- Network: France Télévisions, CBC/Radio Canada
- Release: 7 November – 8 November 2018

Apocalypse: Never-Ending War 1918–1926 (in French: Apocalypse, La Paix Impossible 1918–1926) is a two-part television series retracing the difficult peace that followed the First World War. It was broadcast in France on France 2 on November 11, 2018 and in Canada on Ici RDI on November 7 and 8, 2018. It brings together known or unpublished period documents relating the major events of the time. Archival images have been restored and colorized. The series is directed by Isabelle Clarke, Daniel Costelle and Mickaël Gamrasni.

== Episodes ==
As the First World War ends, survivors realize that the world they knew had disappeared, buried in the ruins. The victors conceive a precarious peace treaty which they impose on the vanquished. In Europe, Africa, and Asia new nations are forged, often through strife and conflict. In a brief time hatred, fear, and resentment bubble up from the depths of traumatized societies, sowing chaos in the new world order in the form of revolutions, crises, waves of migration, and civil wars, which are fertile ground for totalitarianism. People try to shake off memories of war to the frantic beat of the Charleston dance, blind to the approach of a new apocalypse.

- Episode 1 - Revenge (La vengeance)
- Episode 2 - Return to Hell (Retour vers l’enfer)

== See also ==
Apocalypse: Never-Ending War 1918-1926 is part of the Apocalypse series of documentaries which also includes:

- Apocalypse: The Second World War
- Apocalypse: Hitler
- Apocalypse: Stalin
- Apocalypse: Verdun
- Apocalypse: World War I
- Apocalypse: the Cold War
- Apocalypse: Hitler Takes on the West
- Apocalypse: Hitler Takes on the East
