= Apocalypse (chess variant) =

Chess variant

a5 black knight	b5 black pawn	c5 black pawn	d5 black pawn	e5 black knight
a4 black pawn	b4	c4	d4	e4 black pawn
a3	b3	c3	d3	e3
a2 white pawn	b2	c2	d2	e2 white pawn
a1 white knight	b1 white pawn	c1 white pawn	d1 white pawn	e1 white knight

Apocalypse gameboard and starting setup

Apocalypse is a chess variant invented by C. S. Elliott in 1976. Each player starts with two horsemen and five footmen on a 5×5 board. The two sides make their moves simultaneously.

The game was featured in Issue 53 of Games & Puzzles magazine. The name Apocalypse is a reference to the Four Horsemen of the Apocalypse.

== Game rules ==
The starting setup is as shown. Horsemen and footmen move the same as knights and pawns respectively do in chess, except footmen do not have a double-step option on their first move. For each turn, every player secretly writes down their move, then they simultaneously declare them. The following rules apply:

- If each player moves a piece to the same square, a horseman captures a footman. Same-type pieces are both removed from the board.
- If a capture is declared using a footman, but the piece to be captured moves from its square, the footman move still stands. The move converts to being a diagonal step instead of a capture.
- If a declared move is illegal, the player loses their turn and incurs a penalty point.

Upon reaching the furthest rank, a footman is promoted to a horseman when the player has fewer than two horsemen. Otherwise, the player must redeploy the footman to any vacant square not on the furthest rank; the square to which the footman is redeployed must be written as part of that footman's move. It is illegal for a player to advance their only footman to the last rank while having fewer than two horsemen.

=== End of game ===
A player wins by having at least one footman while their opponent does not. Accumulating two penalty points forfeits the game. The game is drawn if each player loses their last footman at the same time. If both players have footmen remaining, but at least one of the players has no legal moves, the game is a draw (this is similar to the stalemate rule).
