= Apocalypse Now (disambiguation) =

Apocalypse Now is a 1979 American epic war film.

Apocalypse Now may also refer to:

- Apocalypse Now (album), a 1999 album by Pere Ubu
- Apocalypse Now (painting), a 1988 painting by Christopher Wool
- "Apocalypse, Now?", an episode of Medium season 5
- "Apocalypse Now (& Later)", a song from Bought to Rot
