= Le Panorama =

French radio show (1968–1998)

Le Panorama was a radio show on France Culture, which ran daily between 12-1 from 1968 until 1998. It dealt with cultural affairs, and was presented by:

1. Jacques Duchateau
2. Michel Bidlowski
3. Pascale Casanova
4. David Bénichou
5. Roger Dadoune
6. Gilbert Lascault
7. Jean-Maurice de Montremy
8. Lionel Richard
9. Jean Pierre Salgas
10. Véronique Schiltz
11. Nadine Vasseur.
