= Apocalypse: the Cold War =

French television series

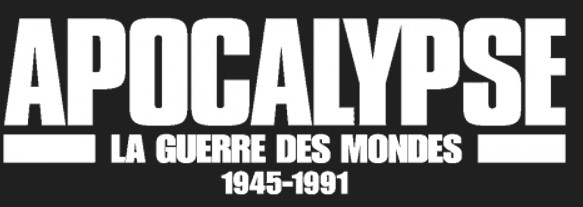
- Created by: Daniel Costelle; Isabelle Clarke; Mickael Gamrasni
- Country of origin: France
- No. of episodes: 6

Production
- Producers: CC&C; ECPAD

Original release
- Network: France Télévisions
- Release: 5 November – 12 November 2019

Apocalypse: the Cold War, also known as Apocalypse: War of worlds (in French: Apocalypse, la guerre des mondes), is a TV series made up of 6 French documentaries which retraces the main events of the Cold War, from 1945 to 1991. Over 200 hours of unpublished archives have been restored and colorized to illustrate the period from the end of World War II until the fall of the USSR in 1991.

These documentaries were written and produced by Isabelle Clarke and Daniel Costelle, with the collaboration of Mickaël Gamrasni.

The series was originally broadcast in several countries on various French-language television channels. Also, the series was broadcast by National Geographic in several regions of the World.

== Episodes ==
Number of episode	Title	Original title	Synopsis
1	The Great Rift	La Grande rupture	(1945-1946) While the victorious nations celebrate a return to peace, a more shady confrontation is in the making between former allies. Western democracies are concerned about Stalin's growing power in the east. Communist ideology continues to spread, and in Indochina, Ho Chi Minh kicks off a protracted war against France.
2	The Escalation of Fear	L’Escalade de la peur	(1947-1949) Fearing that a damaged Europe might fall prey to Communism, Americans launch the Marshall Plan, a reconstruction aid for the European nations. The French also need help in Indochina, where Ho Chi Minh watches his army and his power grow. Stalin imposed a blockade in Berlin and the red wave continues to roll across continents. In Korea, war breaks out between the Communists in the North and a destitute South Korean army. Truman sends in his troops, but a real debacle is waiting for them. Entrenched in Pusan and surrounded by the enemy, can the Americans hold out?
3	The World Trembles	Le Monde tremble	(1950-1952) In Korea, the conflict drags on. After a successful landing at Incheon, General MacArthur and his troops are once again defeated near the Yalu River, where they face a new enemy: China. In Indochina, the French are taking a beating. The similarities between both conflicts are striking. French General de Lattre believes both wars to be one and the same: a war for freedom and against Communism, with Stalin as the real enemy.
4	The Conquest	La Conquête	(1953-1955) Stalin is dead and his potential successors eagerly flock to pay respects to. In East Berlin, a wave of hope comes over the German workers but is swiftly repressed by the Soviets. In Asia, the heated conflicts are coming to an end. The US leaves Korea without glory, while the French, who fall in Dien Bien Phu, fight their last battle in distress. The Geneva Conference makes Ho Chi Minh the undisputed leader of North Vietnam, but the South remains in Western hands.
5	The Wall	Le Mur	(1956-1962) Khrushchev closes the door on the Stalin years. Determined to open up the USSR to the outside world, "Mister K" surprises the entire world by visiting the United States. But the man who approved the repression of the Budapest uprising hasn't gone soft. He is preparing a co-existence with newly elected President Kennedy that will be anything but peaceful, with issues like the Berlin Wall, the Cuban Missile Crisis, and the support he gives Ho Chi Minh in Vietnam. In return, on June 26, 1963, Kennedy delivers his famous speech to an emotional crowd: "Ich bin ein Berliner".
6	The Abyss	L’Abîme	(1963-1991) President Kennedy has been assassinated in Dallas. His successor Johnson sinks his country further into the chaos of the Vietnam War. Over a period of 10 years, 3 million Americans discover Hell. Footage of the war aired on television often leads to protests in favour of the peace. And in 1973, America withdrew its troops. This is a victory for the Communist world, but the Soviet Union has been weakened. The "satellite" republics demand their freedom. In 1989, the Berlin Wall falls, followed by the dissolution of the Soviet empire in 1991.

== See also ==
- Apocalypse: The Second World War
- Apocalypse: Hitler
- Apocalypse: Stalin
- Apocalypse: World War I
- Apocalypse: Never-Ending War 1918-1926
