= Apocalypse: World War I =

- French logo
- Created by: Daniel Costelle; Isabelle Clarke
- Narrated by: Mathieu Kassovitz (French); François Arnaud (English)
- Countries of origin: France; Canada
- No. of episodes: 5

Production
- Producers: CC&C; ECPAD
- Running time: 4 hours 20 minutes

Original release
- Network: France Télévisions, TV5 Québec Canada, National Geographic Channels, American Heroes Channel, TVO, Knowledge Network, RTBF, Planète +
- Release: 2 March – 16 March 2014

Apocalypse: World War I (in French: Apocalypse, la Première Guerre mondiale) is a TV series made up of 5 French documentaries created by Isabelle Clarke and Daniel Costelle, and narrated by Mathieu Kassovitz. Originally broadcast in 2014, it chronologically traces the history of World War I, from its origins to the end of the war. It gathers known or unpublished period documents and recounts the great events of the war, from restored and colorized archive images. It is part of the Apocalypse series, produced by CC&C and ECPAD.

It was originally broadcast on Belgian Une (RTBF) from March 2, 2014, to March 16, 2014, on France 2 from March 18, 2014, to April 1, 2014, and in Canada on TV5 Québec Canada in May 2014.

== Episodes ==
Number of episode	Title	Original title	Synopsis
1	Fury	Furie	(until August 1914): Origin of the conflict and the clash between empires.
2	Fear	Peur	(September 1914 – August 1915): Battle of the Marne and internationalization of the conflict.
3	Hell	Enfer	(September 1915 – July 1916): appearance of bloody weapons never seen before; Battle of Verdun and Battle of the Somme.
4	Rage	Rage	(August 1916 – September 1917): there are already a huge number of deaths in combat. The United States enters the scene.
5	Release	Délivrance	(October 1917 – June 1919): Allied victory and world peace, but the scars do not seem to be definitively closed.

== See also ==
- Apocalypse: The Second World War
- Apocalypse: Hitler
- Apocalypse: Stalin
- Apocalypse: Verdun
- Apocalypse: Never-Ending War 1918-1926
- Apocalypse: the Cold War
