= Supreme War Council (disambiguation) =

Supreme War Council may refer to:

- Conseil supérieur de la guerre (1872–1940), highest military authority in the French Third Republic
- Supreme War Council (Japan), a permanent war cabinet under the Empire of Japan
- Supreme War Council (1917–20), central strategic planning organization of the Allies of World War I
- Anglo-French Supreme War Council (1939–40), joint strategic planning council of the Allies of World War II
