= Maurice Gamelin =

French general (1872–1958)

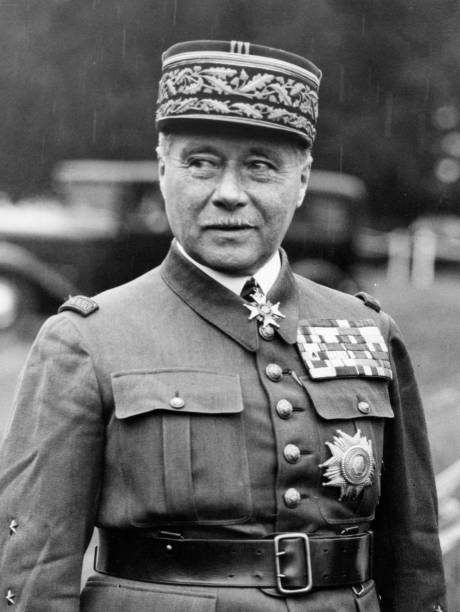
- General Gamelin in September 1939

Commander-in-Chief of the Allied Armies in France
- In office 2 September 1939 – 20 May 1940
- President: Albert Lebrun
- Prime Minister: Édouard Daladier; Paul Reynaud
- Minister of War: Édouard Daladier
- Preceded by: Position established
- Succeeded by: Maxime Weygand

12th Vice-President of the Conseil supérieur de la guerre
- In office 18 January 1935 – 2 September 1939
- President: Albert Lebrun
- Prime Minister: Pierre-Étienne Flandin; Fernand Bouisson; Pierre Laval; Albert Sarraut; Léon Blum; Camille Chautemps; Léon Blum; Édouard Daladier
- Minister of War: Louis Maurin; Jean Fabry; Louis Maurin; Édouard Daladier
- Preceded by: Maxime Weygand
- Succeeded by: Himself as Commander-in-Chief of French Land Forces

31st Chief of the Army Staff of France
- In office 12 February 1931 – 19 May 1940
- Preceded by: Maxime Weygand
- Succeeded by: Position disestablished

Personal details
- Born: 20 September 1872 Paris, France
- Died: 18 April 1958 (aged 85) Paris, France
- Spouse: Eugénie "Lucienne" Marchand (m.1927)
- Children: Jean-René Avondo (b.1913)

Military service
- Allegiance: France
- Branch/service: French Army
- Years of service: 1891–1940
- Rank: Général d'armée
- Battles/wars: First World War; First Battle of the Marne; Battle of the Somme; German spring offensive; Hundred Days Offensive; Meuse–Argonne offensive; Great Syrian Revolt; Second World War; Battle of France
- Awards: Legion of Honour (Grand-croix); Médaille militaire Et al.

Maurice Gustave Gamelin (French pronunciation: [mɔʁis ɡystav ɡamlɛ̃]; 20 September 1872 – 18 April 1958) was a French general who served as head of the French Army from 1935 and as Commander-in-Chief of the Allied Armies in France from the outbreak of the Second World War to his dismissal during the Battle of France in May 1940. The strategic choices Gamelin made ultimately left France vulnerable to a lightning offensive through the Ardennes and have been extensively criticised by historians.

Gamelin distinguished himself in the First World War. As an advisor to Commander-in-Chief Joseph Joffre, he played an active role in planning the First Battle of the Marne in 1914. Later, as commander of a division in 1918, he successfully contributed to the halting of the initial push of the German spring offensive despite being vastly outnumbered. Between 1919 and 1924, Gamelin headed the French military mission to Brazil. In September 1925, he was placed in command of French troops in the Levant and led the pacification of the Great Syrian Revolt.

In 1931, Gamelin assumed the position of Chief of the Army Staff, later succeeding General Maxime Weygand as Vice-President of the Conseil supérieur de la guerre (head of the army) in 1935. A staunch republican, Gamelin ensured that the army stayed out of politics following the election of the Popular Front in 1936 and developed a close working relationship with Édouard Daladier. Gamelin's responses to the geopolitical crises of the interwar period, up until the 1939 Danzig crisis, were marked by caution and served to dissuade French politicians from military intervention.

Gamelin's war strategy envisioned a long war (guerre de longue durée) in which Germany would be weakened by an Allied blockade while Britain and France built up their forces, eventually creating the conditions for a decisive offensive. During the Phoney War, Gamelin opted for the Dyle plan, which extended the planned forward defence into Belgium. He amended the plan in March 1940 to commit more forces to the forward defence, depleting the northern strategic reserve, which played directly into the hands of the German invasion plan. Gamelin was dismissed from command in the midst of the subsequent rapid French collapse on 19 May, (Note: Dismissed in the evening of 19 May, Gamelin handed over command to Weygand the following morning.) just nine days into the battle.

Disgraced after the defeat, Gamelin was imprisoned by the Vichy regime and tried at the Riom Trial in 1942, where he refused to answer the charges against him. In March 1943, he was arrested by the Germans and taken to Tyrol where he was held alongside other French VIP prisoners. He and the other French VIPs were freed after the Battle of Castle Itter in May 1945. After the war, Gamelin lived a life of solitude until his death in 1958.

== Early life and education ==
Maurice Gustave Gamelin was born on 20 September 1872 at 22 Boulevard Saint-Germain in Paris to Zéphyrin Auguste Joseph Gamelin (d.1921) and Pauline Adèle Uhrich (d.1924). His father was an adjutant first class in the Quartermaster Corps at the time of his birth. His father had previously been wounded at the Battle of Solférino and later became inspector general of the army, while his mother had been born into a family of officers. His great uncle (Note: According to Gamelin's biographers, Jean-Jacques Uhrich was his maternal grandfather but this is disputed by his mother's birth certificate. Geneanet has Jean-Jacques as Gamelin's great uncle, which is partly supported by Ancestry.com.: "Maurice Gustave GAMELIN". Geneanet.; "Jean Jacques Alexis UHRICH «Le Général»". Geneanet.; "Pauline Adèle Uhrich in the Paris, France, Births, Marriages, and Deaths, 1555-1929". Ancestry.com. Archives de Paris; Paris, France; État-Civil 1792-1902. Subscription required.; "Jean Jacques Alexis Uhrich in the Paris, France, Births, Marriages, and Deaths, 1555-1929". Ancestry.com. Archives de Paris; Paris, France; État-Civil 1792-1902. Subscription required.) on his mother's side had been the last military governor of Strasbourg before the German annexation of Alsace-Lorraine in 1871. Among his ancestors were sixteen generals.

Gamelin enrolled at Collège Stanislas in 1883 where he excelled academically, receiving his baccalauréats in literature and science in 1889 and 1890 respectively. Hesitant as to whether to become a painter or an officer, Gamelin began preparing for the entrance exam to Saint-Cyr to which he was admitted in 1891. Out of 2,450 applicants, he came 44th, with 463 admitted.

== Early military career ==
Upon graduating top of his class as a second lieutenant in 1893, Gamelin chose to serve with the 3rd Algerian Tirailleurs Regiment which was garrisoned in Constantine. In 1895, he was assigned to a topographical brigade where he excelled in cartography and participated in the 1896 topographical campaign in Tunisia. With the help of his father, Gamelin secured a transfer to the 102nd Infantry Regiment in Paris in 1896 (Note: Between November 1896 and July 1897, he returned to Algeria to complete his topographical work.) that would allow him to prepare for the War College to which he was admitted in 1899. Among his instructors he especially came to respect Lieutenant Colonel Ferdinand Foch and graduated in 1901, second in his class. Having been conferred the rank of captain and completed a series of staff internships, primarily with the 15th Army Corps in Marseille, Gamelin assumed command of a company of the 15th Battalion of the Chasseurs Alpins in 1904, garrisoned in Remiremont. Gamelin remained neutral during the Dreyfus affair, though he was one of very few officers, like his father, who did not believe Alfred Dreyfus was guilty.

In March 1906, Gamelin was authorised to publish Étude philosophique sur l'art de la guerre (Philosophical Study on the Art of War), a book aimed at officers preparing for the War College, which was commended in reviews by military figures. He bought around fifty copies which he sent to all the generals in positions of responsibility while his father offered copies to influential political leaders. In April General Joseph Joffre selected him as his new aide-de-camp, initially stationed in Paris before Joffre was placed in command of the 2nd Army Corps in Amiens in 1908. Gamelin followed Joffre to the Conseil supérieur de la guerre (CSG) in 1910, based in Paris, officially becoming his chief of staff in August 1911 after Joffre had been selected as Vice-President of the CSG. Having been conferred the rank of commandant that June, Gamelin assumed command of the 11th Battalion of the Chasseurs in September, based in Annecy. He was made a chevalier of the Legion of Honour in July 1913. In August he fathered an illegitimate child with Henriette Gras of whom he would become godfather, as was commonplace at the time. He was assigned to the 3rd Bureau of the General Staff (operations) in November, before returning to Joffre's office in March 1914 where he remained at the outbreak of the First World War.

=== First World War ===
In August 1914, Gamelin followed Joffre (Commander-in-Chief of the French Army) to the Grand Quartier Général (GQG) in Vitry-le-François where he served as an advisor to Joffre, also being used as his personal messenger to the army commanders, and was in charge of his liaison with the 3rd Bureau. On 4 September, Gamelin invited Joffre to the 3rd Bureau map room where he outlined the opportunities for a counterattack, to which Joffre declared that they would fight on the Marne rather than retreating behind the Seine as had been otherwise proposed. (Note: All the other officers in the 3rd Bureau also favoured this course of action.) Though Gamelin would later claim in 1930 to be the architect of the First Battle of the Marne, once the other officers in Joffre's immediate circle were dead, the plan was a collective work of officers at the GQG in which he played an active role. He was promoted to lieutenant-colonel in November and that same month met with the singer and actress Mistinguett who wished to ask him whether she should use her relationship with the Austro-Hungarian Prince Gottfried von Hohenlohe-Schillingsfürst to obtain information for the Allies. (Note: Serving as a spy for the Allies, the most important intelligence she obtained was confirmation of an attack on Paris in June 1918 when von Hohenlohe-Schillingsfürst advised her to leave the city.)

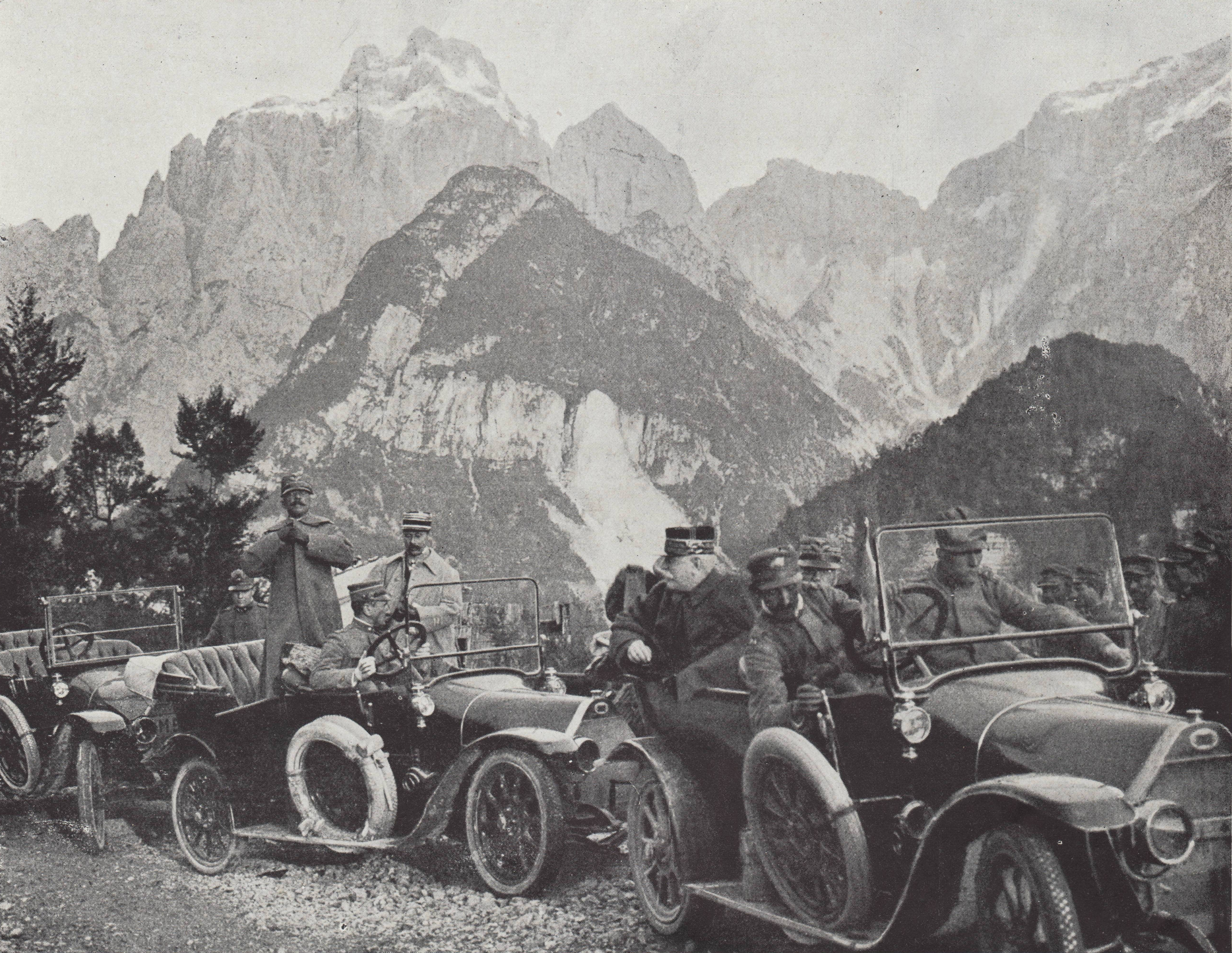
Joffre (right) visiting the Italian front in the Carnic Alps, 1915. Gamelin is standing behind the car on the left.

In June 1915, Gamelin was appointed head of the 3rd Bureau for the armies of the north and east and prepared the Franco-British offensives in Artois and Champagne that would be launched that autumn. Amid the failure of the offensives and the need for him to complete another period of command, he requested a transfer. Joffre placed him in command of a brigade, a position typically occupied by a brigadier general or a colonel with several years of experience. In February 1916, Gamelin assumed command of the 2nd Chasseurs Brigade on the Vosges front and was promoted to colonel in March, with the brigade transferred to the Somme in July. In December, he was appointed temporary brigadier general (Note: Promotions awarded on a temporary basis during the war were subsequently reviewed case-by-case, with most cases leading to demotions. Concerned about his future, Gamelin enlisted the help of his father and notified Joffre of the situation. This was successful with Gamelin promoted to brigadier general on a permanent basis in September 1919.) and briefly tasked with creating the 168th Infantry Division before he was summoned by Joffre and appointed Chief of Staff of the GQG amid the series of events that would lead to Joffre's sidelining and resignation.

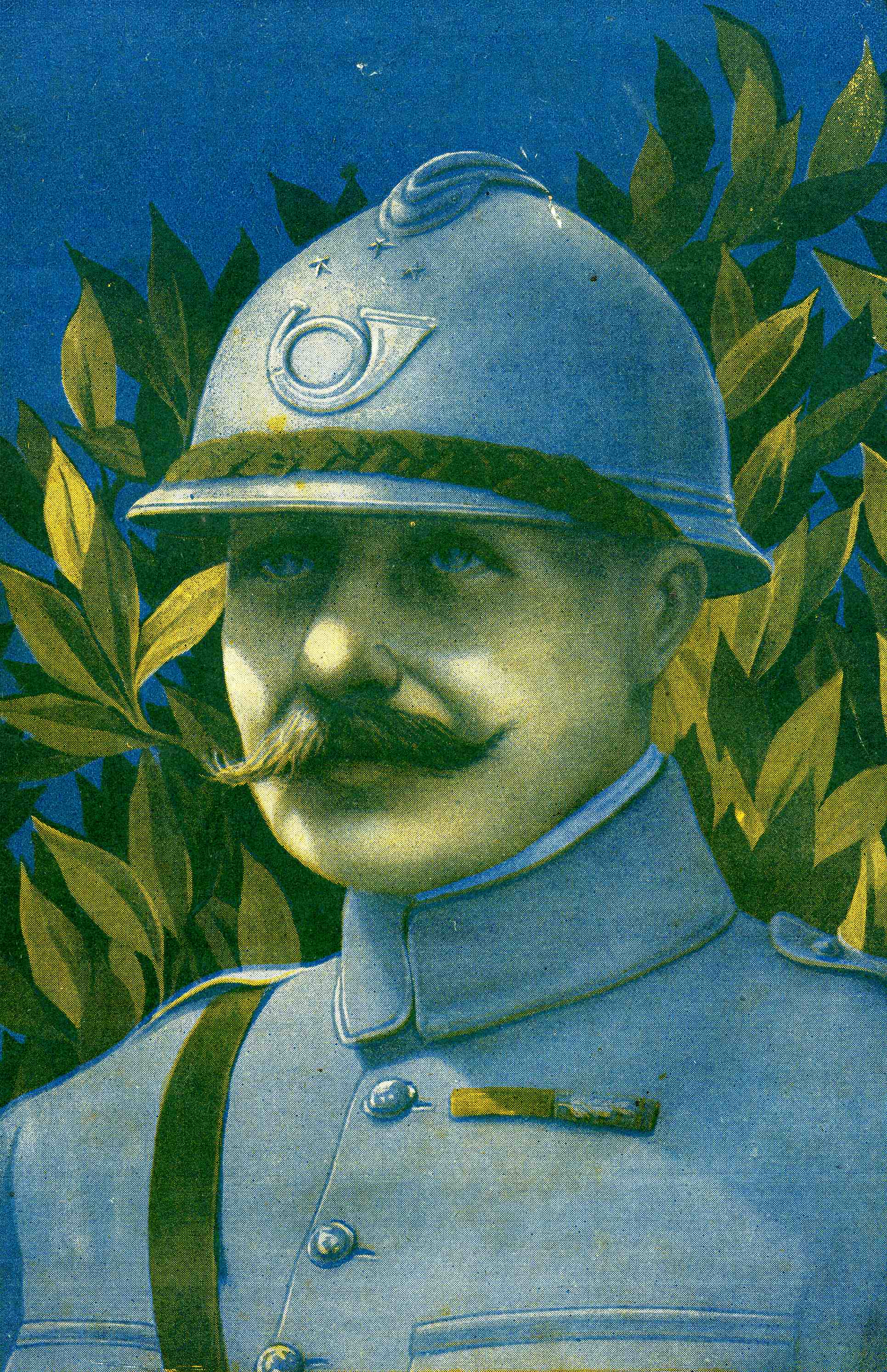
Gamelin depicted on an August 1918 cover of Le Pays de France

With Joffre replaced by General Robert Nivelle, Gamelin was appointed Chief of Staff of the Reserve Army Group (GAR) in Dormans on 27 December under General Joseph Alfred Micheler. Gamelin initially supported the April 1917 Chemin des Dames offensive, though a few days in and amid colossal losses he advocated halting the attack. With the dissolution of the GAR in May, Gamelin assumed command of the 9th Infantry Division which was later placed in reserve in January 1918. In March, the 9th Infantry Division (as part of the 5th Army Corps) was tasked with stemming the German advance with Gamelin setting up a temporary command post in Noyon. Faced with vastly superior forces (six divisions), Gamelin's division successfully slowed the advance until reinforcements could arrive, with more forces thereafter placed under his command. Following these intense battles, the division was rested and moved to the east where, in July as part of the Fifth Army, it successfully repelled an offensive in the Tardenois region and counterattacked. After a period of rest in August, Gamelin's division participated in the Meuse–Argonne offensive until the signing of the armistice on 11 November.

== Interwar period ==
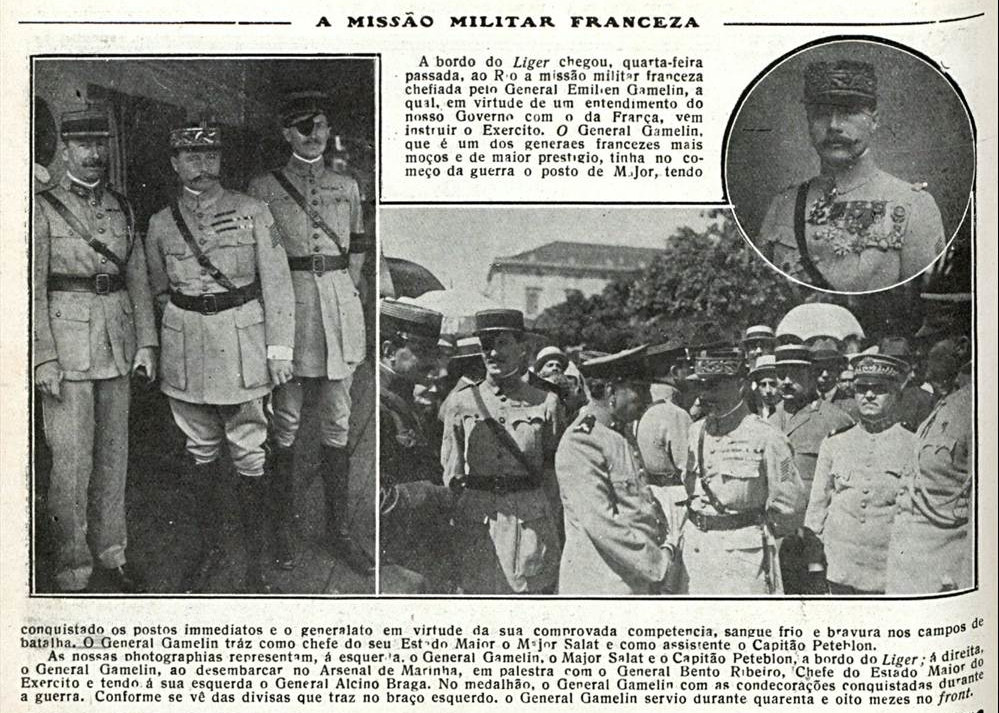
March 1919 article in the Brazilian magazine Fon-Fon on Gamelin's appointment

Initially assigned in January 1919 to a less important position, in command of a brigade, Gamelin obtained an assignment to the French military mission to Brazil, arriving in Rio de Janeiro later that month and officially becoming head of the mission in February. During this time he advised Brazilian governments on reorganising their army and advised Brazilian officers to keep the army neutral amid political turmoil, with the mission leading to significant orders of French armaments.

Gamelin returned to metropolitan France in December 1924 and, amid setbacks in the early stages of the Great Syrian Revolt, he was appointed deputy to General Maurice Sarrail, the High Commissioner of the Levant, in September 1925 and tasked with leading the subsequent operations. To suppress an October insurrection in Damascus, Gamelin ordered the bombardment of the city which garnered the attention of international journalists. He was promoted to the rank of divisional general in December, with his position as commander-in-chief of the French troops in the Levant formalised a few days later. Gamelin commanded a pacification campaign that ran from autumn 1925 to the end of June 1926 and which effectively suppressed the revolt. In September 1927, he married Eugénie Marchand (commonly known as Lucienne) in Paris, while retaining his position, and was promoted to général de corps d'armée that November. Gamelin left Syria in August 1928 and, after his end-of-campaign leave, assumed command of the 20th Army Corps in Nancy in March 1929.

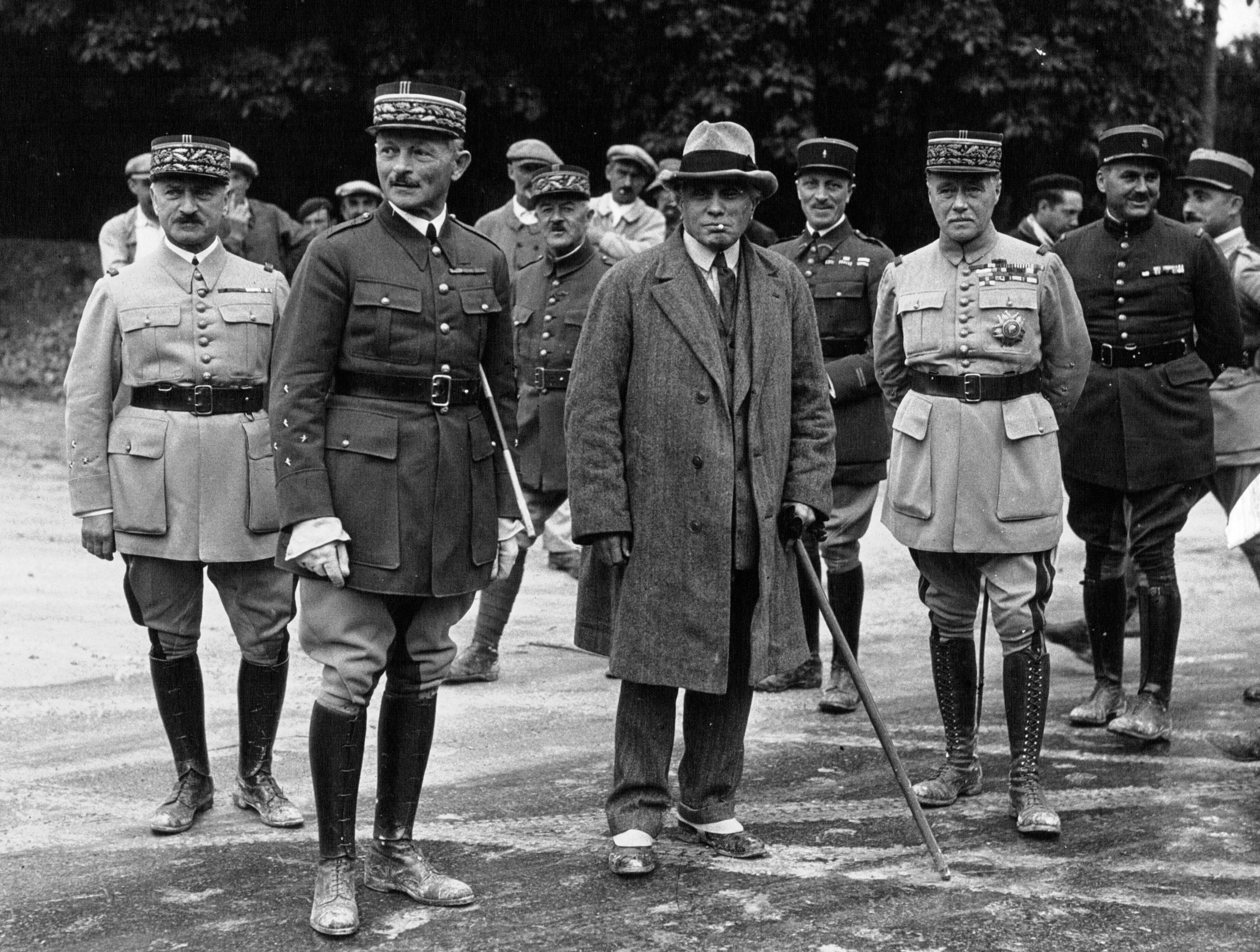
Foreground (L-R): Weygand, Minister of War Joseph Paul-Boncour, and Gamelin during September 1932 military exercises

In January 1930, Gamelin was informed by Minister of War André Maginot of the government's decision to appoint him First Deputy Chief of the Army Staff with the understanding that he would in effect be third-in-line to head the army after Vice-President of the CSG Philippe Pétain and soon-to-be Chief of the Army Staff Maxime Weygand. Pétain retired in February 1931 and was replaced by Weygand while Gamelin assumed the position of Chief of the Army Staff, thus joining the CSG.

In January 1932, and amid budgetary constraints on the army, Gamelin warned of the covert German rearmament before the parliamentary National Defence Budget Committee. However, he sought to play down the scale of the German threat later that year and supported the efforts of the World Disarmament Conference, believing in the effectiveness of the League of Nations.

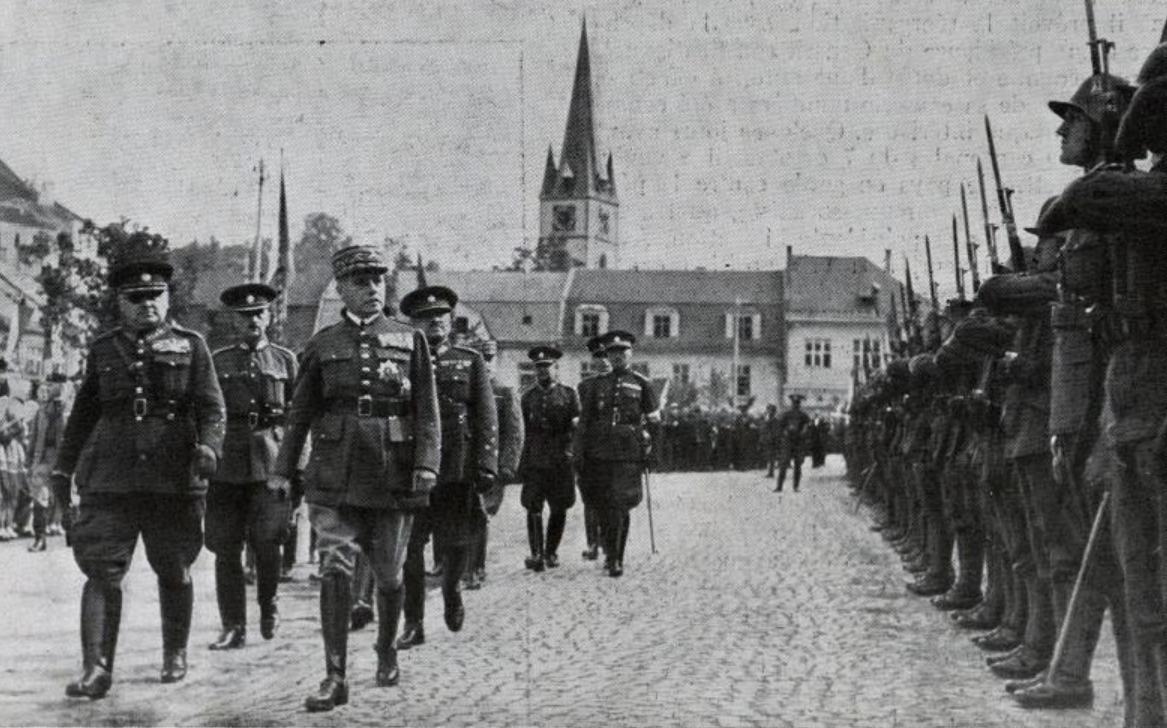
Gamelin (right) and General Jan Syrový during a trip to Czechoslovakia in 1934

Gamelin agreed with Weygand that the Maginot Line could not be an end in of itself and similarly opposed the extension of the Maginot Line towards Belgium on the basis that the country was an ally and the necessary funds would hinder the modernisation of the army. In contrast to Weygand who was uncompromising when it came to matters of national security, Gamelin believed that military leaders should not obstruct government policy regardless of the consequences.

=== Head of the army ===
With Weygand reaching the legal retirement age of 68, Gamelin was selected as Vice-President of the CSG while retaining his position as Chief of the Army Staff on 18 January 1935, with the decree fusing the two roles. This made him the first person to combine both positions since Joffre in 1911. These roles encompassed him being the designated commander-in-chief in a time of war and being responsible for preparing the military establishment for such an eventuality.

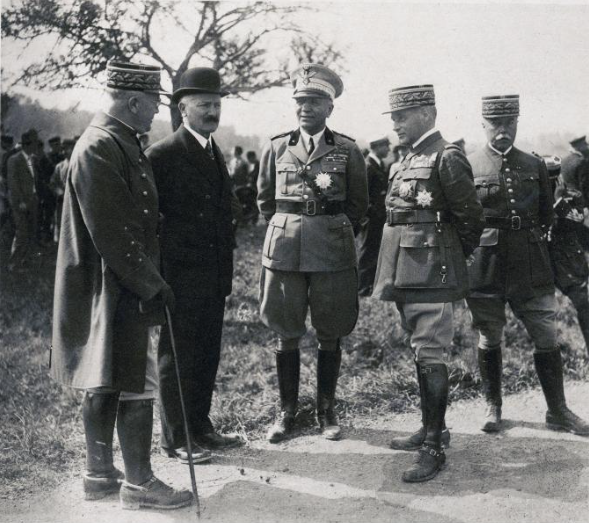
Military exercises in Champagne, September 1935. L-R: General Georges, President Lebrun, Badoglio, Gamelin.

Gamelin supported an alliance with Italy in order to strengthen the Allied camp and preclude an Italian-German alliance and maintained contact with Marshal Pietro Badoglio who he had befriended during his time in Brazil. Gamelin met with Badoglio in Rome in June 1935 to discuss Franco-Italian security cooperation, also meeting with Benito Mussolini during his stay. However, this ultimately unravelled due to the Italian invasion of Abyssinia and the election of the anti-fascist Popular Front in France the following year. Gamelin thereafter decided to consider Italy potentially hostile and resumed espionage activities in the country in August 1937.

Gamelin's first crisis came with the German reoccupation of the Rhineland on 7 March 1936. Having been asked to draft a note on the military possibilities, Gamelin delivered this to Minister of War Louis Maurin on 11 March, with it then being passed on to Prime Minister Albert Sarraut, in which he presented inflated figures of German troop numbers. According to Gamelin's biographer he did this deliberately and suppressed or filtered out Deuxième Bureau reports to the contrary, believing that military intervention would lead to a war in which France would be defeated. Gamelin conditioned limited intervention in the Saarland on mobilising the couverture renforcée, a strictly defensive force devised in 1931 that was to be deployed to the frontier in order to provide cover for a general mobilisation. Together with Maurin advocating general mobilisation as a prerequisite for intervention, this had the effect of dissuading the civilian ministers from action.

Shortly after the formation of the first Popular Front government, Gamelin met with Prime Minister Léon Blum in June and assured him that he would do everything to keep the army out of politics. With a number of elected officials calling for the army to be "republicanised", Gamelin reminded Blum that the army was a meritocratic institution. Following a speech General Henri Giraud made in September in which he referred to unrest sweeping the country, Gamelin wrote to him, exhorting him to remain out of politics:

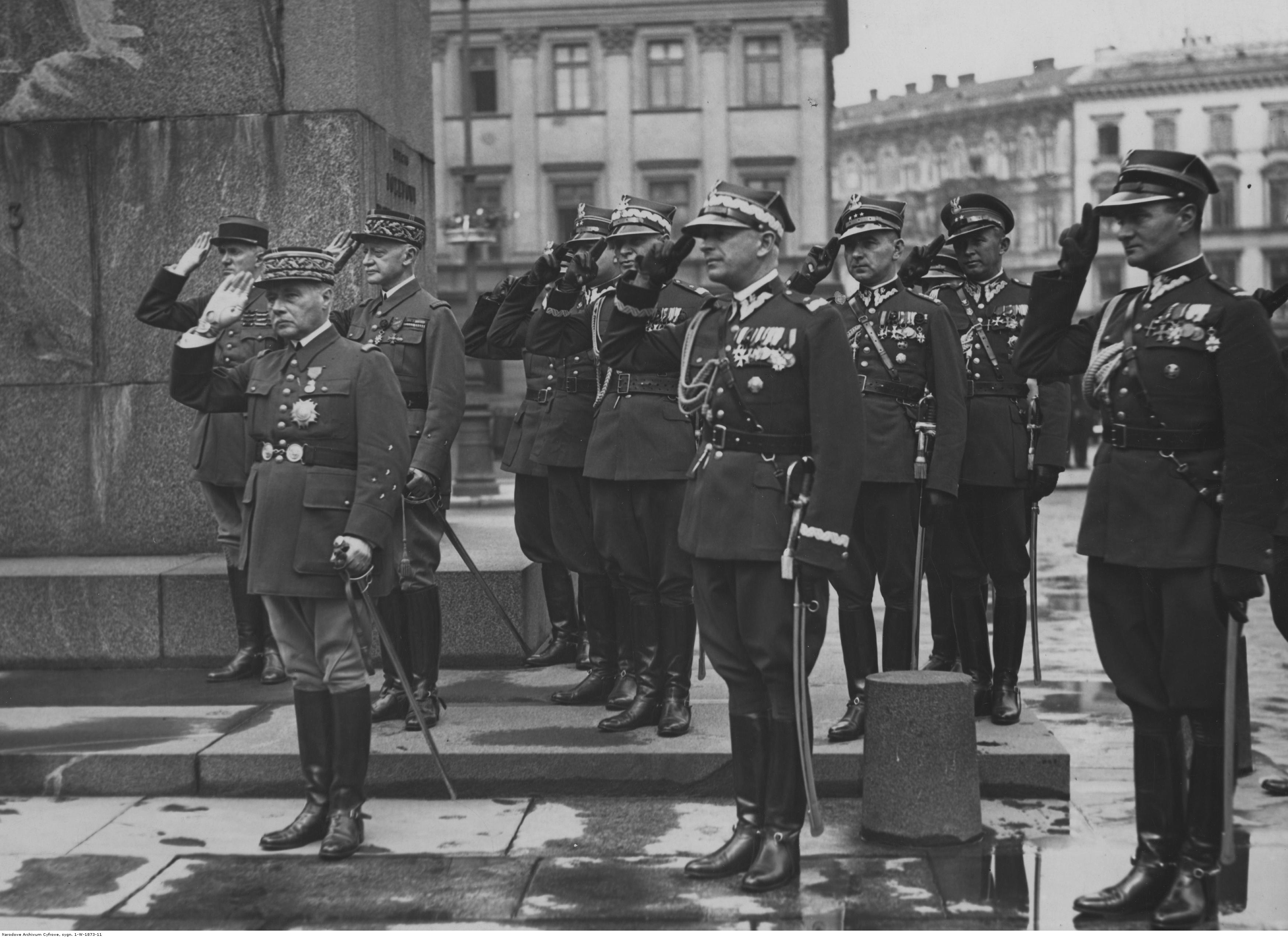
Gamelin (left) at the Tomb of the Unknown Soldier in Warsaw in August

More than ever, it is important that the army remain committed to staying outside and above political squabbles. This is the Minister's concern, and I have vouched for him regarding the attitude of the officer corps, especially the generals... I therefore count on your reflection and your concern for military solidarity so that, while fulfilling your duty fully in all circumstances, as you have always done, you may bring to bear, in areas that may border on politics, the aspects of prudence that are more necessary than ever.

Gamelin developed a close working relationship with Minister of National Defence and War Édouard Daladier, having been allies since 1933, with the two sharing similar political views and agreeing on the necessity of rearming as quickly as possible. According to his biographer, Gamelin's political views would have placed him on the right of the Radical-Socialist Party while Daladier occupied the left wing. The length of their respective tenures made the Gamelin-Daladier partnership the central human element of French defence policy after June 1936.

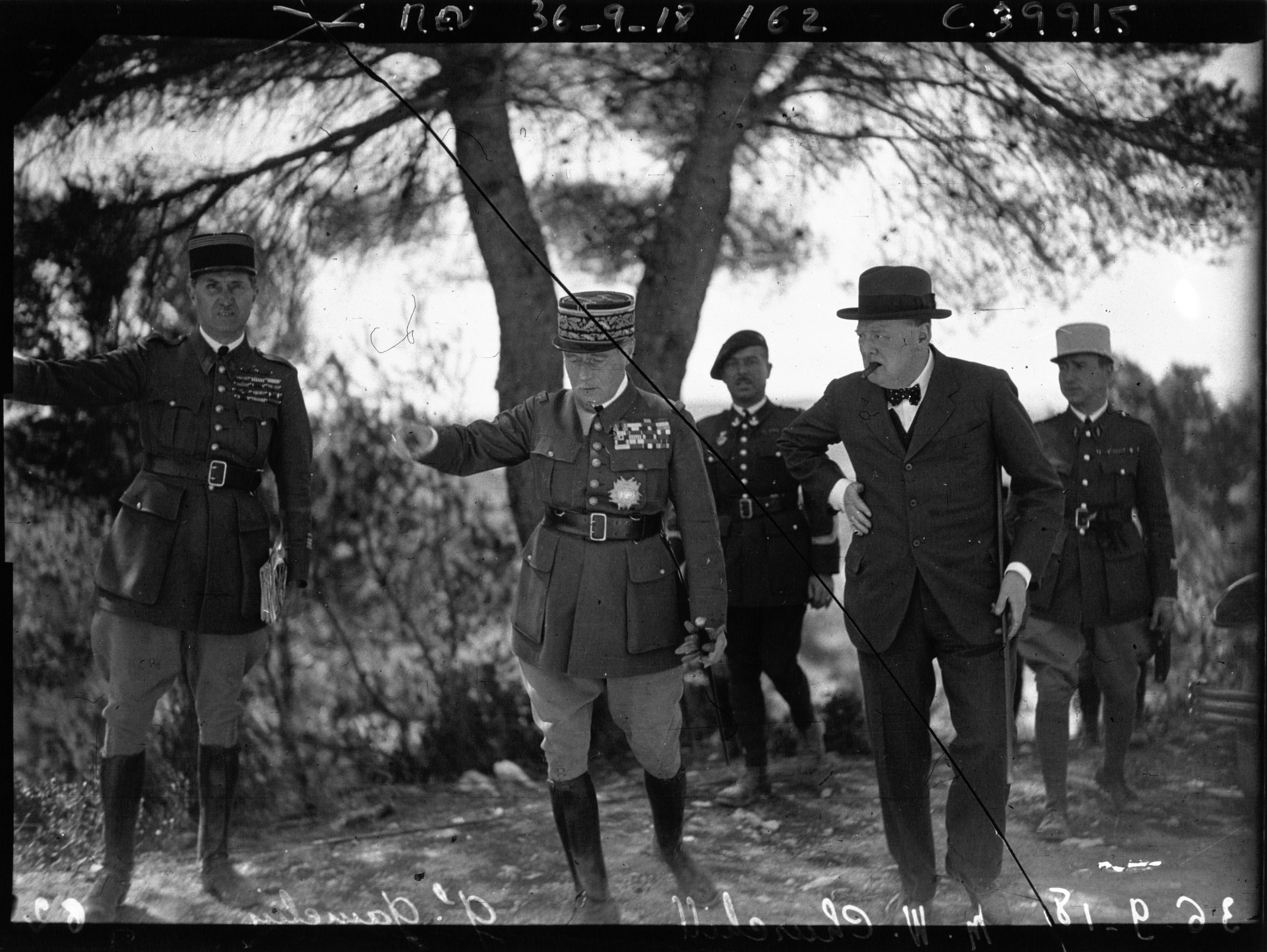
Gamelin (centre) with MP Winston Churchill during French military exercises in September

Following his appointment, Gamelin oversaw the continued revision of the Instruction tactique sur l’emploi des grandes unités (Instruction on the Tactical Employment of Large Units; IGU) which dated back to 1921. The revised document was approved by Daladier in August 1936 and Gamelin thereon discouraged critical discussion of the established doctrine. Though he was unable to prevent the publication of works by General Émile Alléhaut, Colonel Charles de Gaulle, and Colonel Arsène Marie Paul Vauthier, among others, Gamelin sought to limit publications presenting innovative ideas. Being a public document the IGU was studied by the Germans for weaknesses, with the German military journal Militär-Wochenblatt writing in October 1937:

It is not necessary for us to follow our neighbour in his strange, excessively refined method, which seeks to prepare everything down to the smallest detail concerning the combined use of the various, ever more complex, weapons, which seeks success through safety and the care of men, but which nevertheless fails to take into account unforeseen incidents, the frictions that occur in war, and the reactions of the enemy.

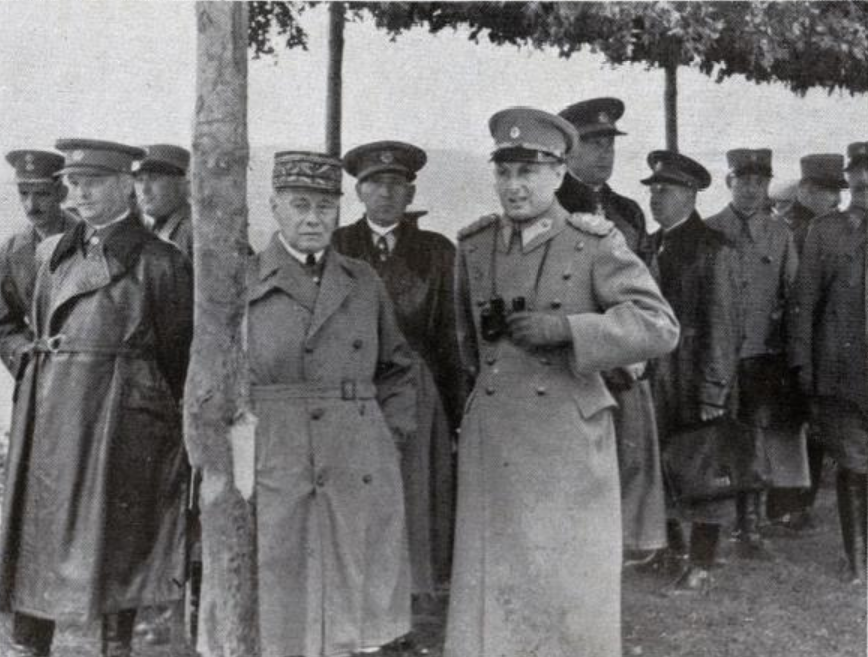
Gamelin and Prince Paul during Yugoslav military exercises in September 1937

Amid the Sudeten crisis on 12 September 1938, Gamelin presented his plan to now-Prime Minister Daladier for an offensive in the Saarland in the event of a German invasion of Czechoslovakia, which he warned would bring about a "modernised battle of the Somme". At May 1939 talks with General Tadeusz Kasprzycki in the midst of the Danzig crisis, Gamelin and Air Force Chief of Staff Joseph Vuillemin deliberately misled the Poles regarding French intentions and their ability to aid Poland's defence. Gamelin promised to conduct limited offensive operations on the third day of German aggression, with a French offensive involving the bulk of its forces to be undertaken once the German effort against Poland intensified (though this could happen no earlier than the fifteenth day after general mobilisation).

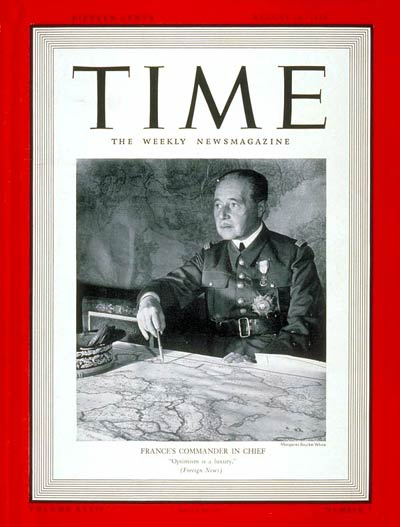
Gamelin on an August 1939 cover of Time magazine

At a meeting of French ministers and military chiefs on 23 August, Daladier posed the question as to whether France could allow Poland and Romania, or either of the two, to be wiped from the map. Gamelin responded that "if France did not come to Poland's aid, it would dishonour itself". Daladier then asked the military chiefs whether they were ready to initiate general mobilisation and wage war, to which Gamelin responded that the army was ready.

==== Mechanisation ====
Gamelin did not oppose the development of Light Mechanised Divisions (DLM, Division légère mécanique), started by Weygand in the early 1930s. However his priority was the motorisation of the infantry, believing that tanks would be thwarted by anti-tank weapons and fearing that France would not have enough fuel to supply large armoured formations.

Gamelin nevertheless supported the establishment of armoured divisions (DCr, Division cuirassée) from spring 1936 in order to counter the new German Panzer divisions, placing him in a minority within the CSG. These divisions were not to act independently or be used in offensive actions; instead they were to be used to restore a degraded area of the front. The CSG ratified the creation of two armoured divisions in December 1938, however they were not Gamelin's priority and he believed that France did not possess the available resources to establish them during peacetime. The statement on armour doctrine issued by Gamelin on 18 December directed the divisions to be used only against inferior forces that were unorganised for defence or to exploit a breakthrough made by infantry divisions. The first DCr was only established in December 1939 after the German invasion of Poland, compromising the readiness of the divisions with regard to organisation and operational procedures.

==== Strategy for war ====
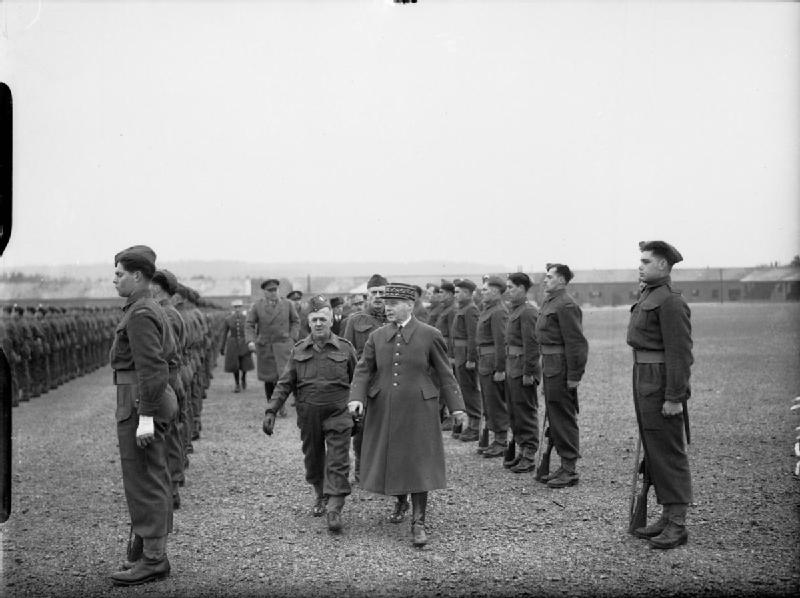
Gamelin inspecting Canadian troops in Aldershot, June 1939

Gamelin's strategy centred around preparing for a long war (guerre de longue durée) in which France and Britain would asphyxiate the German economy with a blockade while building up their own military strength. Gamelin expected the German superiority in resources to diminish month by month until the situation reversed in favour of the Allies, likely by the spring of 1941 in the context of the Second World War— this would then allow the Allies to mount a decisive offensive in 1941 or 1942. The plan thus required that the Allies repel any German offensives in the meantime. Due to Abwehr disinformation, Gamelin believed that an attack through Switzerland was possible but that it would likely be a diversion. He dismissed the notion that the Germans would risk a frontal assault of the Maginot Line.

Gamelin did not believe that the Germans would launch a major attack through the Ardennes and that, if they did, it would take them five days to reach the Meuse and several days of fighting to cross it, by which time reinforcements could be brought in to contain the advance. He believed that past wars had shown the Ardennes region to never have been favourable to large scale operations, a view widely shared among the French high command. During a yearly CSG war game in May–June 1938, General André-Gaston Prételat estimated that enemy motorised forces could reach the Meuse in 60 hours and cross it in 24 hours, to which Gamelin accused him of having played the worst possible scenario. This therefore left Gamelin to focus on the traditional invasion routes, used for centuries, through the Belgian plains.

== Second World War ==
At 12:30 p.m. on 1 September 1939, following the German invasion of Poland, Gamelin was informed that the decree for a general mobilisation had been signed by the Council of Ministers for the following day. He supported Mussolini's brief mediation efforts on the basis that it would buy him more time to mobilise and that German rejection might offend Italy and cause them to withdraw from the Axis.

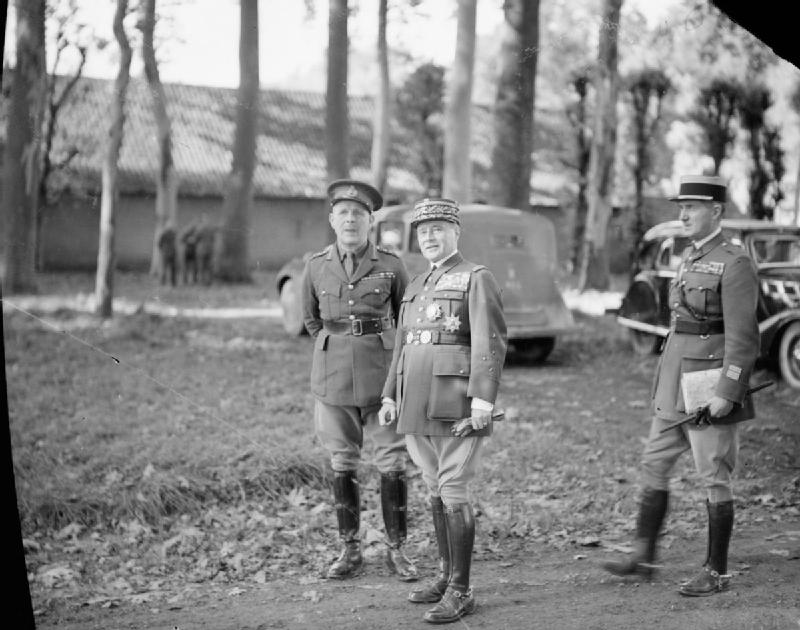
Lord Gort and Gamelin (centre) in Berlencourt-le-Cauroy, October 1939

On 7 September, Gamelin launched a limited offensive into the Saarland, however he halted this on 12 September and French troops retreated behind the Maginot Line on 4 October after the Polish defeat. Gamelin had expected Poland to hold out for between four and six months, however its rapid defeat meant that he was faced with the prospect of an attack westwards sooner than he had expected. He circulated a Deuxième Bureau report on the Polish campaign, emphasising the need to prepare for anti-tank combat, though no changes were made to the doctrine and he did not believe in the risk of a similar collapse occurring in the west.

Gamelin established his command post at the Château de Vincennes, separate from the Grand Quartier Général (GQG) at La Ferté-sous-Jouarre, since his role as Chief of the General Staff for National Defence (Note: Gamelin was appointed to this position on 21 January 1938. Newly created, it required him to coordinate the air and land forces in preparation for war.) required him to maintain contact with the Minister of National Defence in Paris and it was far enough away from political power so as to avoid political meddling. Though the communication centre located in the basement possessed teletypes and a telephone exchange, there were no radios or carrier pigeons and most messages were carried by motorcycle couriers. It soon became clear that the geographical dispersal of command, partly done to satisfy concerns about vulnerability to air attacks, was detrimental to the efficiency of communication and coordination between the different services. In January 1940, Gamelin enacted reforms that split the GQG between La Ferté-sous-Jouarre, where commander-in-chief of the North Eastern Front General Alphonse Joseph Georges was based, and Montry, which was located roughly halfway between Georges and Gamelin. These measures were partly driven by a desire to undermine Georges's authority and only served to further complicate the situation.

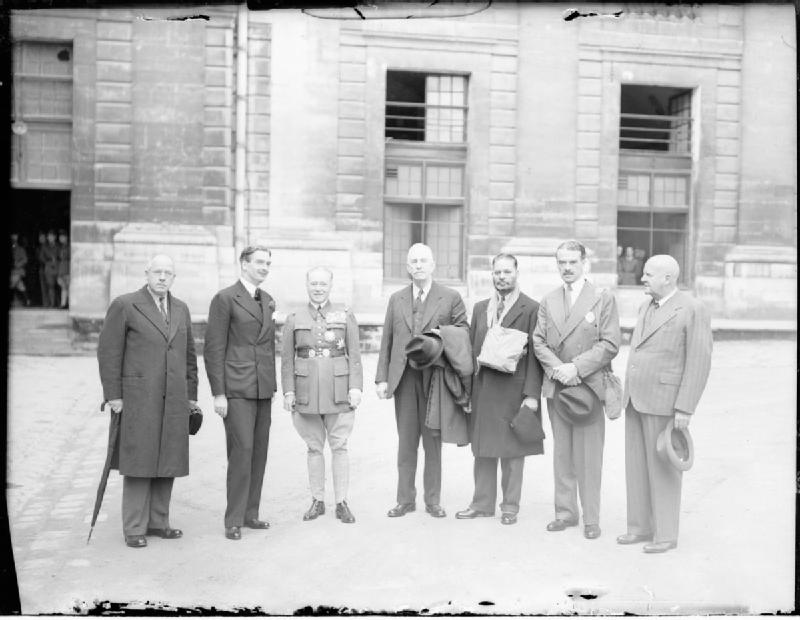
Commonwealth representatives visiting Gamelin (third from the left) outside his Vincennes headquarters, November 1939

Gamelin initially opposed the notion of a forward defence into Belgium on the basis that a Belgian appeal after the outbreak of hostilities would not allow the Allied armies enough time to reach their defensive lines before the German advance. However this changed when, following Franco-British discussions in May 1939, Prime Minister Neville Chamberlain and Daladier asked Gamelin to advance into Belgium, which was to be up to the Scheldt (Escaut in French).

Given that the Belgians were fortifying the Gembloux gap (an area of open plains that the Allied armies would have to advance through with no natural defensive positions) and with British approval, Gamelin made the decision in November to extend the planned advance to the Dyle Line, provided the Belgians appealed for assistance in time. Following the Mechelen incident, Gamelin assembled his units along the Belgian border on 14 January under the assumption that they would imminently be invited in, however they were withdrawn after Belgium reiterated its stance of neutrality. In March 1940, Gamelin amended the Dyle plan to extend the advance of the extreme left flank up to Breda in order to link up with the Dutch army. This required him to commit more divisions, including his best, to the forward defence and left Army Group North, under General Georges, without a significant strategic reserve.

In a document setting out his war strategy in February, Gamelin once again emphasised to Daladier the importance of reaching an agreement with Italy. Daladier was succeeded as prime minister by Paul Reynaud in March, though he retained his position as Minister of War and National Defence, with a rivalry between the two leading Reynaud to resent Gamelin's closeness to Daladier. Unimpressed with Gamelin's responses on the German invasion of Denmark and Norway, Reynaud remarked on 9 April: "He is a prefect. He is a bishop, but he is in no way a leader... This cannot continue." Reynaud convened a meeting of the War Cabinet on 12 April with the intention of having him removed, however Gamelin was staunchly defended by Daladier. Not wanting to provoke a ministerial crisis, Reynaud declined to propose a successor at the meeting. A bout of flu delayed Reynaud further and it was not until 9 May that he was able to convene another meeting of the War Cabinet where he reiterated his case, in agreement with the other ministers present. With Daladier's continued opposition, Reynaud announced his intention to resign and form a new government without him, however the German offensive that commenced the following day caused him to suspend his decision.

=== Battle of France ===
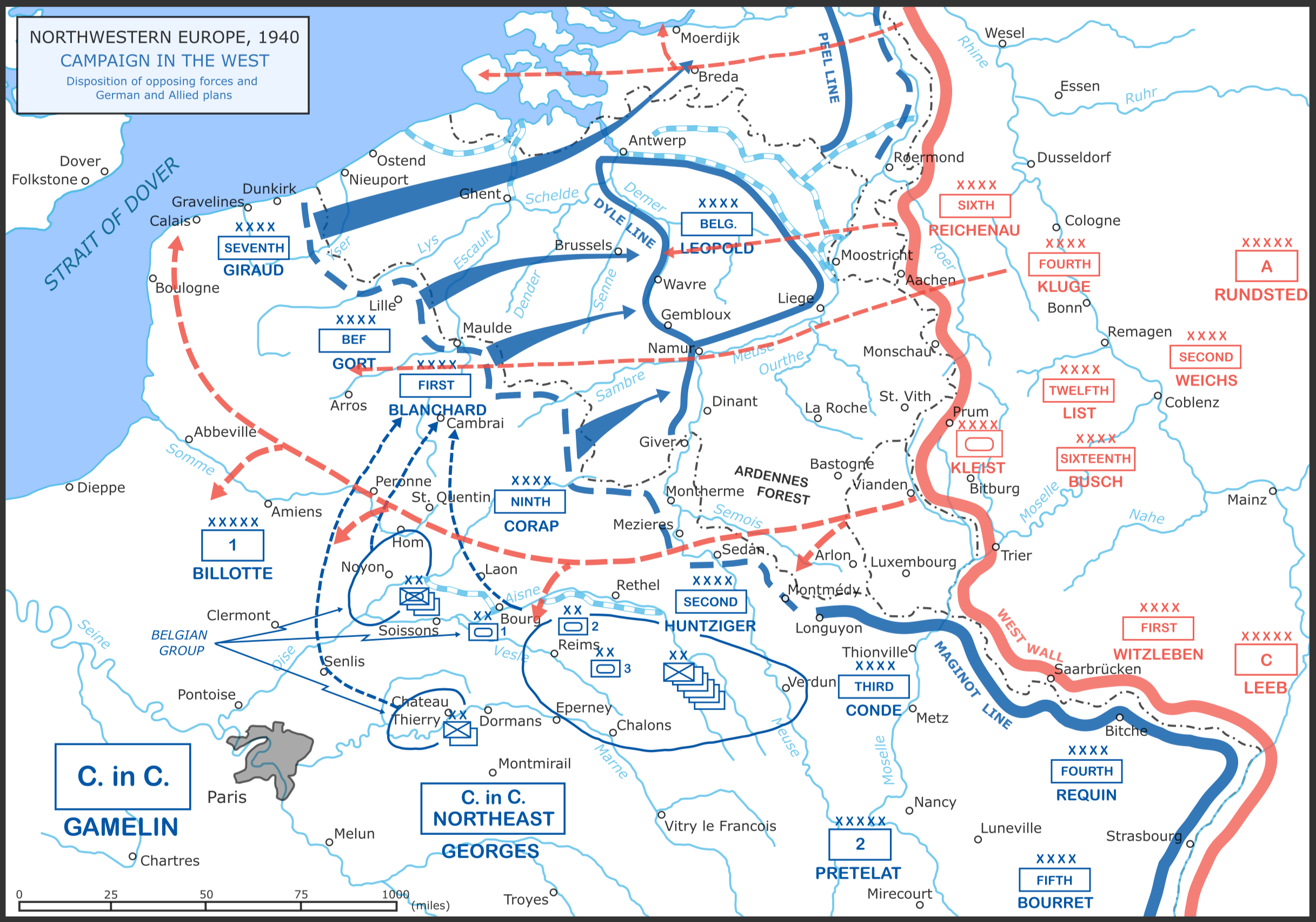
The Breda variant of the Dyle plan and the Manstein plan, as well as the positions of Allied and German forces on the eve of battle

Gamelin was woken shortly after 6:00 a.m. on 10 May, whereupon he received news of the German offensive and was informed of the consequent Belgian appeal for assistance. At 6:35 a.m., he telephoned General Gaston Billotte and gave the order to activate the Dyle-Breda plan.

On 11 May, Gamelin delegated his command over the BEF and the Belgians to General Georges without discussing it with him, who in turn delegated the command to Billotte who already had an overwhelming workload. The German capture of the Moerdijk causeway led the Dutch army to withdraw to their fortifications northwards, nullifying the purpose of the Breda manoeuvre to link up with Dutch forces.

On 12 May, Gamelin dismissed a suggestion that the lack of Luftwaffe bombing raids indicated a trap, responding that most of the German bombers were in Norway and the air force may not be able to fulfil all its objectives. The Germans succeeded in crossing the Meuse at three places on 13 May and though the First Army Group managed to reach the Dyle line, they were unable to establish a firm foothold. On 15 May, Georges telephoned Gamelin to report on the progress of the Panzer divisions and asked him to dismiss General Charles Huntziger from his command of the Second Army and swap generals André Corap and Henri Giraud in command of the Ninth Army and Seventh Army respectively. Gamelin refused to dismiss Huntziger but agreed to swap Corap with Giraud— this allowed Corap to be scapegoated for the breakthrough by Reynaud. Gamelin sent his military attaché to London to inform the British authorities of the situation and to demand more support from the RAF. He then sent his personal driver to fetch his wife, who he gave instructions on how to prepare to leave the capital.

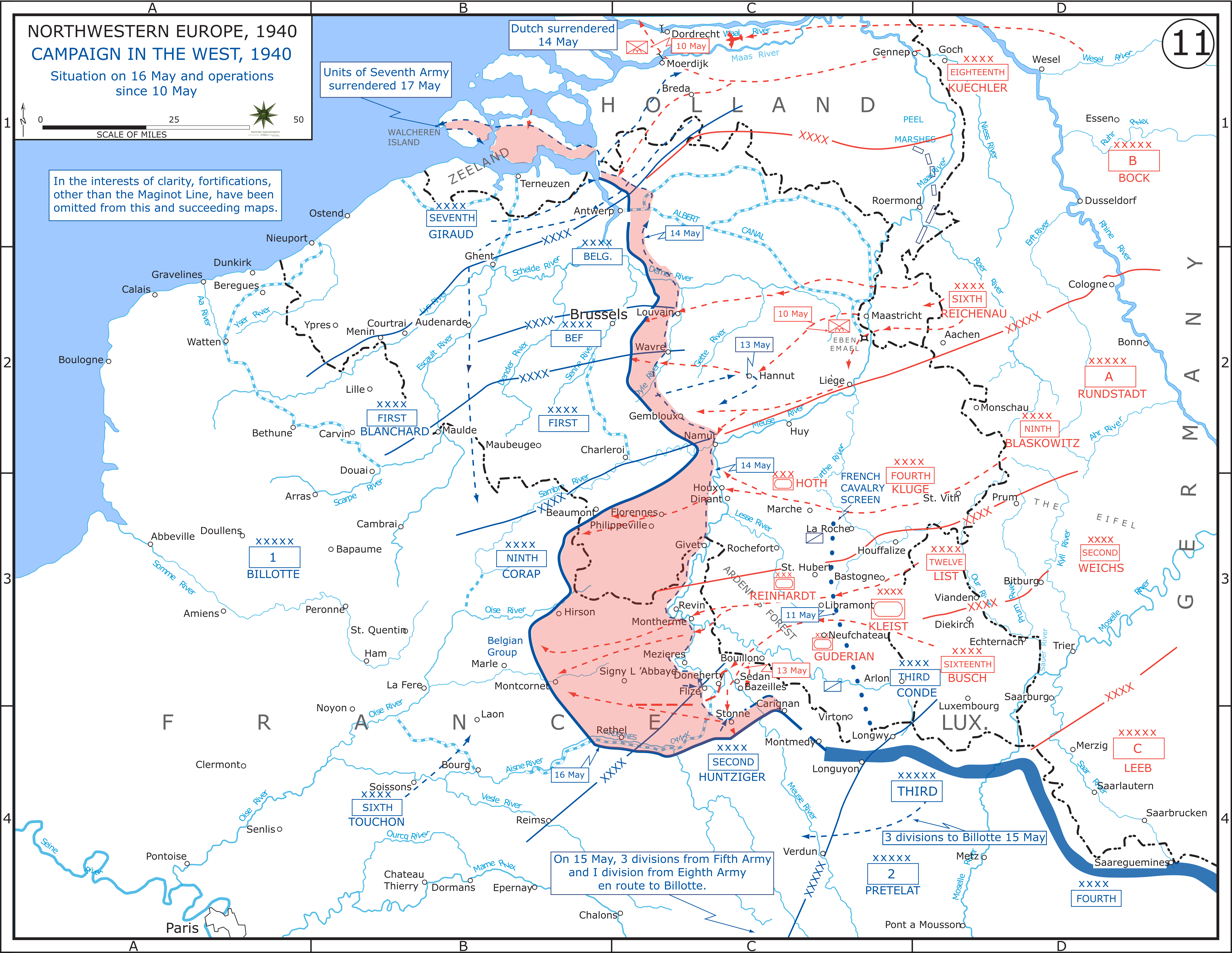
Front line situation between 14–16 May

At a meeting in Reynaud's office on 16 May, Gamelin explained the situation on a map to French leaders and Prime Minister Winston Churchill and requested that the BEF extend its front to allow a counterattack to the south. Incredulous, Churchill made Gamelin repeat his presentation and subsequently asked "Where are the strategic reserves?", then in French "Où est la masse de manoeuvre?". Dejected, Gamelin turned to Reynaud and announced "Il n'y en a aucune" ("There is none").

On 17 May, Daladier requested from Gamelin a brief report on the reasons for the debacle. Gamelin submitted this on 18 May, in which he outlined reasons for the collapse but minimised or omitted any responsibility on the part of himself or the high command. Earlier that day, he had received a telegram from Marshal Badoglio informing him that he had nothing to fear from Italy for the moment. (Note: According to historian Max Schiavon, Badoglio appears to have believed in good faith that no offensive would be launched.)

On the morning of 19 May, Gamelin issued his first and only order since the beginning of the fighting, which began with the words: "Without wishing to interfere in the conduct of the ongoing battle, which falls under the authority of the Commander-in-Chief on the Northeast Front, and approving all the measures he has taken..." He delivered the order to Georges in the form of a folded sheet of paper, leaving it on his desk without discussing its contents. Shortly after 9 p.m. at Vincennes, Gamelin received an envelope from Reynaud informing him of his dismissal. General Weygand arrived at 9.a.m. the following morning to take command, with Gamelin requesting that his officers be allowed to write a report on the situation as of 20 May and that a copy be sent to him. He was accompanied by Weygand to the door, with Gamelin then remarking for the other officers to hear: "In short, I'm not leaving you in such a bad situation". He went to his car without bidding farewell to his colleagues and travelled directly home.

==== Postwar analysis ====
Julian Jackson notes "the supreme irony of Gamelin's career that a man so cautious and rational should have taken—and lost—such a massively risky gamble". He suggests that it may have been precisely Gamelin's rationality and caution that made it so he could not imagine that the Germans would take the "extraordinary gamble" of sending most of their armoured forces through the Ardennes. Though he notes that Gamelin seemed "temperamentally unwilling to confront unpleasant realities", Jackson asserts that he cannot be made the scapegoat for everything that went wrong during the Battle of France. He asserts the view that it is pointless to seek out individual culprits for the French defeat, pointing to how "almost the entire French High Command had been caught unawares by the new kind of warfare". According to Jackson, Gamelin shared qualities with generals George C. Marshall, Alan Brooke, and Aleksei Antonov, who he says were the real architects of Allied victory in 1945, with it being "Gamelin's tragedy" that he was not able to employ his qualities where they would have been most useful.

According to Gamelin's biographer Max Schiavon, Gamelin placed too much emphasis on intelligence at the expense of willpower and energy, with Schiavon quoting Jules Romains who had met him on occasion: "He was one of those, I suppose, whose intellectual forces are badly co-ordinated with their forces of action." Schiavon notes that he preferred to guide, advise, and suggest rather than direct and demand. Gamelin's first biographer Colonel Pierre Le Goyet draws a contrast between Joffre who concentrated power and Gamelin who dispersed and diluted it. According to Schiavon, Gamelin viewed himself as a "man of synthesis" and a high-level observer, consequently being uninterested in details. In neglecting the need to account for unforeseen tactical and technological innovations, Schiavon argues that Gamelin failed to learn the lessons not just from the campaigns in Poland and Norway but from the history of war since antiquity.

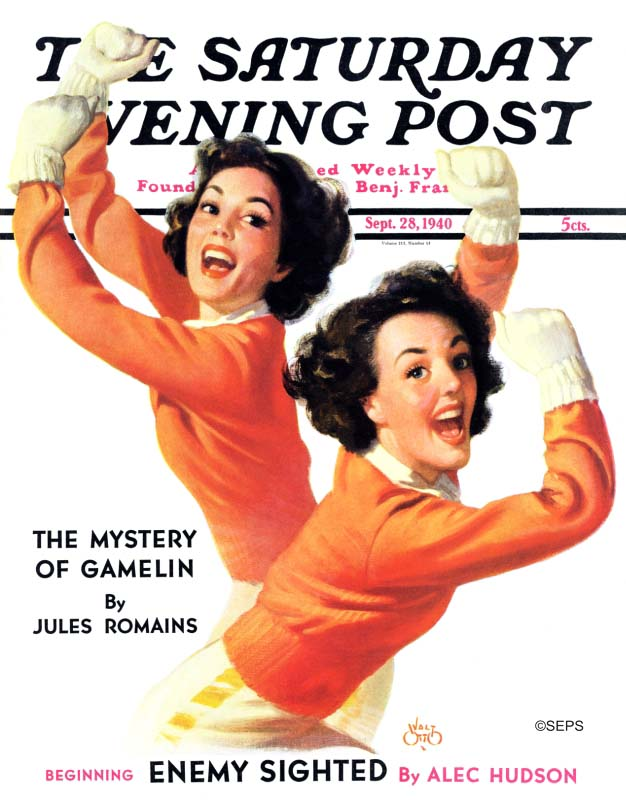
Cover of the 28 September 1940 The Saturday Evening Post issue where Romains's article was first published

Romains coined the phrase the "Gamelin mystery" in a September 1940 article to refer to the apparent conundrum of how a man with such a stellar reputation could have led the Allied armies to disaster. French journalist Gérard Chauvy suggests that the answer to the Gamelin mystery may lie in his supposedly "barely contained" neurosyphilis illness. Schiavon notes that claims of Gamelin suffering from neurosyphilis, Bayle's disease, intellectual decompensation, schizophrenia, or split personality disorder have circulated post war, particularly since the 1976 book Ces malades qui nous gouvernent (These Sick People Who Govern Us). He dismisses the claims as pseudo-diagnoses made without access to Gamelin's medical records and based on inaccuracies.

Schiavon concludes that all the evidence points to "a staggering gulf between what [Gamelin] should have been and what he actually was", remarking that "the man was not made to face chaos". In the context of fears that plagued the Third Republic about a generals-led coup d'état, Schiavon emphasises the role of politicians—especially Daladier—in elevating Gamelin, keeping him in place, and extending his responsibilities despite having become aware of his shortcomings.

==== Aftermath ====
Certain that he would soon be indicted for the defeat, Gamelin began preparing his defence. Fearing capture due to the German advance, Gamelin left Paris with his wife and aide-de-camp in June 1940 and travelled first to Cromac before settling in Bayac at the château of a friend. He wrote to Weygand, informing him of his decision and offering his services but received no response. Wanting to remain incognito during his brief excursions in the Bergerac region, he allowed his hair to grow long and dyed it ginger.

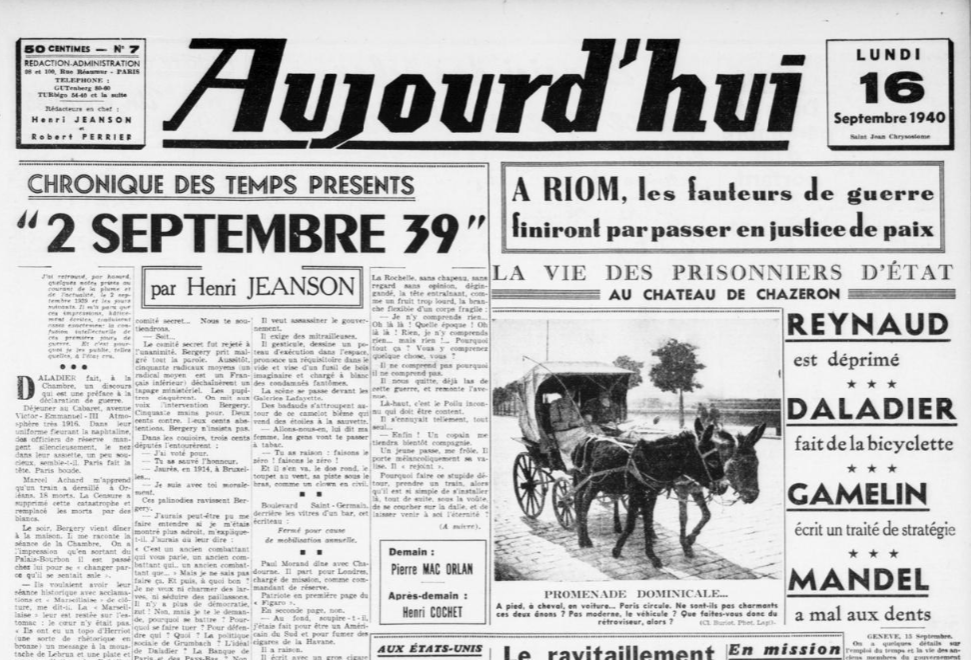
September 1940 front page of Aujourd'hui mocking the prisoners

On 6 September, Gamelin was arrested by the Vichy regime and imprisoned at the Château de Chazeron under house arrest alongside Blum, Daladier, Georges Mandel, and Reynaud. Gamelin, Blum, and Daladier were moved to the Château de Bourassol on 14 November. On 12 November 1941, Gamelin was transferred to the Fort du Portalet in the Pyrenees where he was held alongside the other defendants in the Riom Trial and Reynaud. From the beginning of Gamelin's time in prison, he underwent a lasting religious transformation that had begun a year earlier whereby he sought solace in religious practices and prayer.

Gamelin was questioned by the investigating magistrate of the Riom Trial four times between September 1940 and September 1941 regarding the industrial mobilisation, the January 1940 reorganisation of the GQG, the low morale of troops, and the failure to learn from the Polish campaign. He was the only defendant to respond in writing to the depositions and reports sent to him by the court and sent the magistrate ten memoranda for which he wrote nearly 2,500 pages of notes. According to Schiavon, the memoranda contained "enormous falsehoods" and omitted any contradictory facts. Gamelin hired two lawyers close to the regime that were known for their far-right views and at the start of the trial on 19 February 1942 declared that he would maintain his silence when questioned out of his duty to his subordinates, emphasising the importance of the delay in rearming.

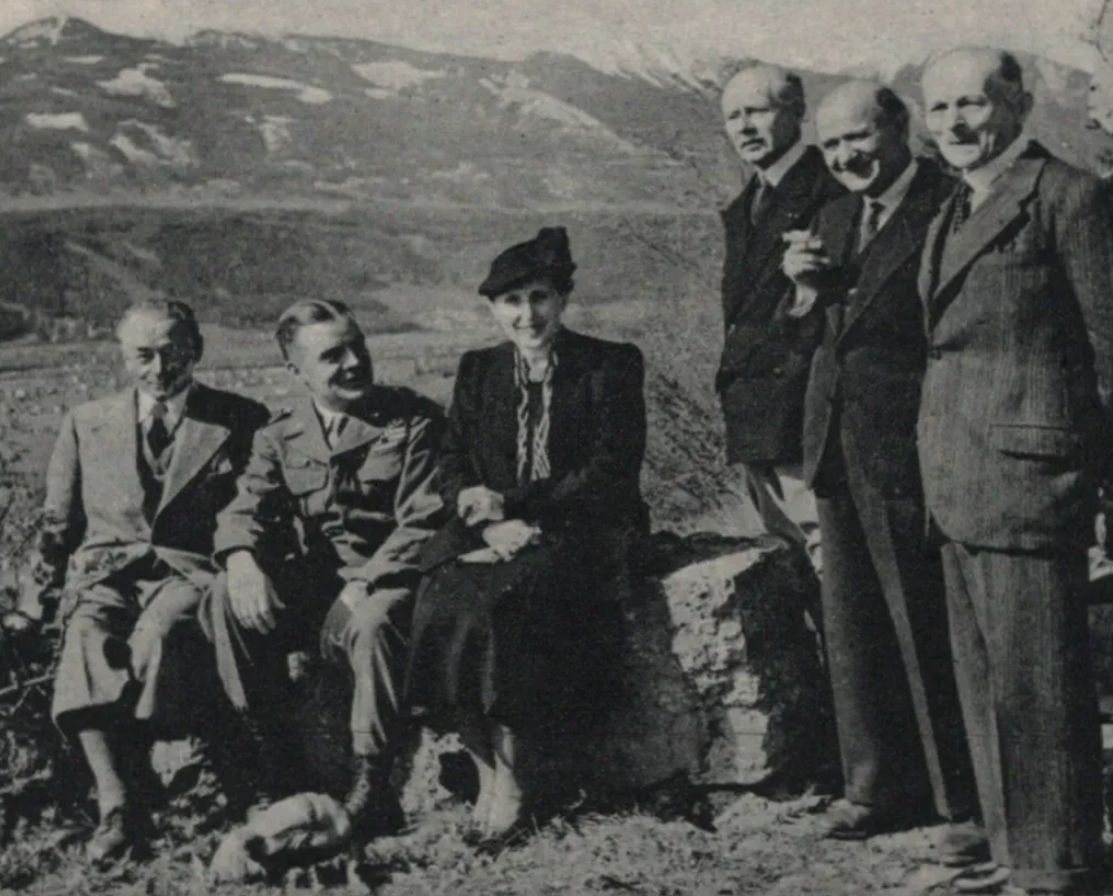
Castle Itter prisoners after being freed. L-R: Reynaud, General Anthony McAuliffe, Marie Weygand, Gamelin, Daladier, Weygand.

On 31 March 1943, the Riom Trial defendants were arrested by the Germans and transferred to a hunting lodge attached to Buchenwald concentration camp, near Weimar, arriving on 4 April. On 2 May, Gamelin, Daladier, and Léon Jouhaux were moved to Castle Itter in Tyrol where they were joined by Reynaud and Jean Borotra on 12 May and later by François de La Rocque and Michel Clemenceau among others. During this time Gamelin assisted Reynaud in writing his memoirs, with the two having reconciled. When Weygand arrived with his wife, Reynaud and Gamelin ignored him and refused to take their meals at the same table.

With the approach of the American advance, the SS guards abandoned their uniforms on 3 May 1945 and fled. On the initiative of Weygand and Gamelin, the VIP prisoners broke into the now-unguarded weapons room and armed themselves with a variety of pistols, rifles, and submachine guns. During the subsequent Battle of Castle Itter, a shell struck Gamelin's room though he was safely in another part of the building with other French VIPs. Gamelin, alongside La Roque and Captain Marcel Granger (brother of Henri Giraud's son-in-law), initially struggled to secure a plane to Paris, having been told that one was waiting for them in Sigmaringen. However, they managed to take an ambulance plane to Strasbourg where they were able to secure passage on the plane of American diplomat Robert Murphy, landing at Le Bourget Airport on 8 May.

== Post war ==
Gamelin began writing his memoirs in the months that followed, having recovered his archives that he had secured in June 1940. The first two volumes of his memoirs, entitled Servir (To Serve), were published in 1946, with the third volume published in 1947. In them Gamelin justified his actions and shifted responsibility for the defeat onto his subordinates, acknowledging none on the part of himself. From publication and for a long time afterwards, they were received with severe criticism. Julian Jackson describes the memoirs as exhibiting "to great effect" Gamelin's slipperiness.

Ostracised, Gamelin maintained contact with only a handful of generals and rarely left his home except for short walks along Avenue Foch where he lived. On occasion he was visited by his godson and illegitimate son Jean-René Avondo. He contributed ten articles to La Dépêche du Midi in the spring and summer of 1948 on foreign policy, the lessons of the world wars, and the future of France and monitored the press for articles concerning him, sometimes intervening in the controversies. In 1951 he began work on a book about the First Battle of the Marne, which was published in 1954.

== Death ==
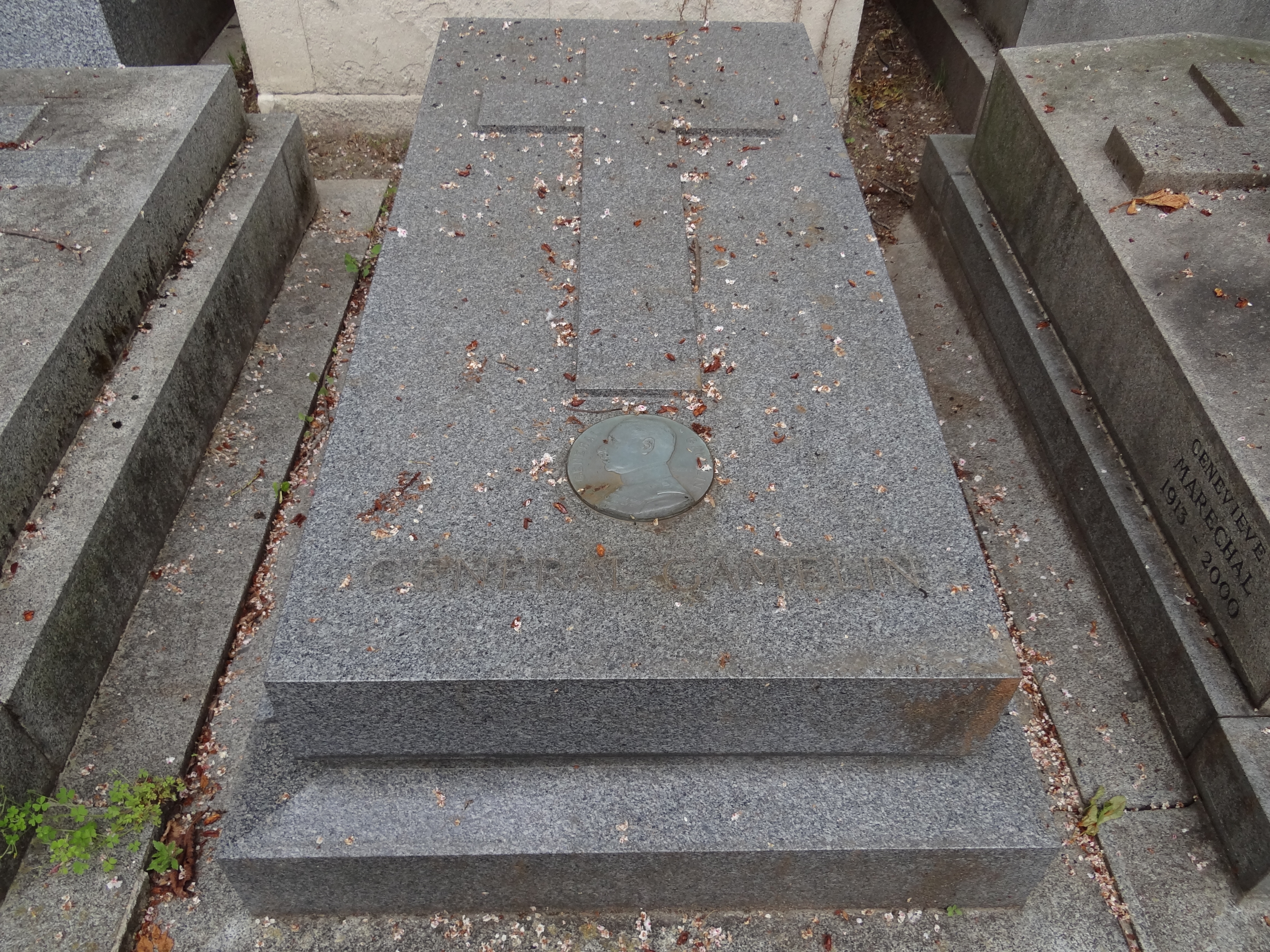
Gamelin's grave in Paris. The text at the bottom reads "GENERAL GAMELIN".

On 22 January 1958 Gamelin fell down a flight of stairs and struck his head, whereafter he was taken to Val-de-Grâce military hospital. He later succumbed to his injuries and died of a cerebral haemorrhage on 18 April, aged 85. Shortly before he died, he wrote his last wishes:

I decline the military honours to which my Grand Cross of the Legion of Honour entitles me. I believe that the troops of the French army currently have more urgent tasks than paying tribute to those who did not have the chance to lead them to victory... I am certainly convinced that it is not my fault that we were unable to contain the German attack in 1940. But the fact remains. And we must bow to the decisions of fate.

=== Commemoration ===
Charles de Gaulle visited his coffin, as did Joseph Paul-Boncour. The government refused to grant him an honour guard or to hold a mass at the Cathedral of Saint-Louis-des-Invalides. A more simple funeral was held at the Church of the Val-de-Grâce on 24 April, after which he was buried at Passy Cemetery. Due to the May 1958 crisis, Gamelin's passing went by largely unnoticed.

== Selected works ==
- Capitaine breveté Gamelin (1906). Étude philosophique sur l'art de la guerre (essai d'une synthèse). Annexes: discussion d'un sujet tactique; une étude d'action décisive [Philosophical Study on the Art of War (An Attempt at a Synthesis). Appendices: Discussion of a Tactical Topic; A Study of Decisive Action] (in French). Paris: R. Chapelot.
- General Gamelin (1946). Servir, Tome 1: Les armées françaises de 1940 [To Serve, Vol. 1: The French Armies of 1940] (in French). Paris: Plon.
- General Gamelin (1946). Servir, Tome 2: Le prologue du drame, 1930-août 1939 [To Serve, Vol. 2: The Prologue to the Drama, 1930-August 1939] (in French). Paris: Plon.
- General Gamelin (1947). Servir, Tome 3: La guerre, septembre 1939-19 mai 1940 [To Serve, Vol. 3: The War, September 1939-19 May 1940] (in French). Paris: Plon.
- General Maurice Gamelin (1954). Manoeuvre et victoire de la Marne [Manoeuvre and Victory at the Marne] (in French). Paris: B. Grasset.

== Decorations and honours ==
France

- Grand Cross of the Legion of Honour – 8 July 1932
  - Grand Officer – 16 September 1926
  - Commander – 12 July 1923
  - Officer – 28 December 1918
  - Knight – 10 July 1913
- Médaille militaire – 31 December 1935
- Croix de Guerre (1914–1918) (one palm)
- Croix de guerre des théâtres d'opérations extérieures
- 1914–1918 Inter-Allied Victory medal
- 1914–1918 Commemorative war medal

French Annam
- Grand Officer of the Imperial Order of the Dragon

French Lebanon
- Order of Merit (1st Class)

Morocco
- Grand Cross of the Order of Ouissam Alaouite

French Tunisia
- Grand Cross of the Order of Nichan Iftikhar

Belgium

- Croix de guerre
- Officer of the Order of Leopold
- Grand Cross of the Order of the Crown

Brazil

- Grand Cross of the Order of the Southern Cross
- Grand Cross of the Order of Military Merit

United Kingdom

- Knight Grand Cross of the Order of the Bath
- Companion of the Order of St Michael and St George
- Knight Grand Cross of the Royal Victorian Order
- King George VI Coronation Medal

Czechoslovakia

- Grand Cross of the Order of the White Lion

Finland

- Grand Cross of the Order of the White Rose of Finland

Greece

- Grand Cross of the Order of the Phoenix
- Grand Cross of the Royal Order of George I

Italy

- Knight Grand Cross of the Order of the Crown of Italy
- Knight Grand Cross of the Order of Saints Maurice and Lazarus

Japan

- Order of the Rising Sun (1st Class)

Latvia

- Grand Cross of the Order of the Three Stars

Lithuania

- Grand Cross of the Order of Vytautas the Great
- Grand Cross of the Order of the Grand Duke Gediminas

Monaco

- Grand Cross of the Order of Saint Charles

Poland

- Grand Cross of the Order of Polonia Restituta

Romania

- Grand Cross of the National Order of Faithful Service
- Commander of the National Order of Merit

United States

- Distinguished Service Medal

Yugoslavia

- Order of the White Eagle (1st Class)
- Royal Order of Karađorđe Star (2nd Class)

Siam

- Member of the Order of the Crown of Thailand
- Order of the White Elephant (1st Class)

Russia

- Commander of the Order of Saint Vladimir

Others

== Bibliography ==
- Alexander, Martin S. (1992). The Republic in Danger: General Maurice Gamelin and the Politics of French Defence, 1933–1940. New York: Cambridge University Press. ISBN 0-521-37234-8.
- Garçon, Ségolène (2007). "Travailler au Grand Quartier général des Forces Terrestres en 1939-1940" [Work at the General Headquarters of French Land Forces in 1939-1940]. Revue historique des armées (in French). 248: 71–81. ISSN 1965-0779.
- Harding, Stephen (2013). The Last Battle: When U.S. and German Soldiers Joined Forces in the Waning Hours of World War II in Europe. Philadelphia: Da Capo Press. ISBN 978-0-306-82209-4.
- Jackson, Julian (2004). The Fall of France: The Nazi Invasion of 1940. Oxford University Press. ISBN 978-019-280-550-8.
- Kiesling, Eugenia C. (1996). Arming Against Hitler: France and the Limits of Military Planning. Lawrence, KS: University Press of Kansas. ISBN 978-070-060-764-8.
- Le Goyet, Pierre (1976). Le mystère Gamelin [The Gamelin Mystery] (in French). Paris: Presses de la Cité. ISBN 978-225-819-002-3.
- Michel, Henri (1979). Le procès de Riom [The Riom Trial] (in French). Paris: Albin Michel.
- Parker, R.A.C. (1956). "The First Capitulation: France and the Rhineland Crisis of 1936". World Politics. 8 (3): 355–373. doi:10.2307/2008855. JSTOR 2008855.
- Romains, Jules (1940). "The Mystery of Gamelin". Seven Mysteries of Europe. Freeport, NY: Books for Libraries Press. pp. 44–81.
- Schiavon, Max (2021). Gamelin: la tragédie de l'ambition [Gamelin: The Tragedy of Ambition] (in French). Paris: Perrin. ISBN 978-226-208-001-3.
- Streicher, Jean-Claude (2014). Le général Huntziger: l'"Alsacien" du maréchal Pétain [General Huntziger: Marshal Pétain's "Alsatian"] (in French). Colmar: J. Do Bentzinger. ISBN 978-284-960-435-9.
