= Sonder- und Ehrenhaft =

Form of imprisonment in Nazi Germany

Sonder- und Ehrenhaft (German for "special or honorable detention") were categories of detention for political prisoners in Nazi Germany who held particular political value or former status. These prisoners ("Sonder- oder Ehrenhäftlinge", "special or honorable detainees") included political leaders from Nazi-occupied Europe and disgraced members of the German elite. They were treated uncommonly well, and all but a few of them survived World War II.

== Classification ==
The Nazi regime classified its political prisoners into numerous categories, including

- Erziehungshäftlinge, "educational detainees";
- Vorbeugehäftlinge, "preventative detainees";
- Protektoratshäftlinge, "protectorate detainees";
- Sonderhäftlinge and Ehrenhäftlinge, "special detainees" and "detainees of honor".

The latter category also included the "personal prisoners of the Führer" – opponents of the Nazi regime too prominent to be killed outright, as well as people like Hitler's failed assassin Georg Elser, who was initially kept alive with the intention of putting him on a show trial after the war.

== Prisons ==
The SS-Reichssicherheitshauptamt, led by Heinrich Himmler, was responsible for the detention of the Sonder- und Ehrenhäftlinge. It built special detention centers for these prisoners in or near several concentration camps. Most of these facilities were much more comfortable than the camps' normal prisoner barracks.

As the war wore on, the SS increasingly requisitioned a great number of hotels, castles, palaces and mansions, and repurposed them as detention centers. These included:

- Schloss Hirschberg am Haarsee near Weilheim, the guesthouse of the Auswärtiges Amt.
- Rheinhotel Dreesen in Bonn-Bad Godesberg after April 1944.
- Hotel Ifen, a mountain hotel in the Kleinwalsertal, Austria.
- Hotel Forelle, a luxury hotel in Tyrol, Austria.
- Schloss Itter, a palace in Tyrol.

Several other detention centers for high-level prisoners were planned. Albert Speer was charged to rebuild the Schwarzburg castle in the Schwarzatal, Thuringia, for this purpose, but the project was eventually abandoned. Inspired by the American prison of Alcatraz, SS officers searched the Baltic Sea coast for a suitable location of an island prison. In 1942, the SS decided to use the Pakri Islands near Baltischport (now Paldiski in Estonia) for this purpose, but German defeat at the Battle of Stalingrad put this position at risk and the project was also abandoned.

== Conditions ==
The conditions under which the Sonder- und Ehrenhäftlinge were detained ranged from comfortable to luxurious, depending on their status. The prisoners did not have to work, were allowed to wear civilian clothing, and ate the same food as their guards. After the war, Ernst Kaltenbrunner testified at the Nuremberg Trials that the prominent prisoners at places like Hotel Ifen or Bad Godesberg received "a triple diplomat's ration, that is to say, nine times the ration of a normal German during the war, as well as a bottle of Sekt each day."

Many detainees were allowed to receive visits by their family or to have their spouses live with them, and some of the highest-ranking prisoners, such as King Leopold III of Belgium, were allowed a small retinue of servants and followers. However, the prisoners normally had to pay for the cost of their detention. Kurt Schuschnigg, for instance, whose assets the Nazis had confiscated, was billed even for the cost of his relocation to Sachsenhausen.

== List of Sonder- und Ehrenhäftlinge ==
The following is an incomplete list of notable Sonder- und Ehrenhäftlinge. Unless noted, the people listed here survived their detention.

- Léon Blum, the former Prime Minister of France — held with his wife at Buchenwald concentration camp.
- Yakov Dzhugashvili, the son of Soviet leader Joseph Stalin — captured at the Battle of Smolensk and died at Sachsenhausen concentration camp in 1943.
- Georg Elser, a German man who had tried to assassinate Hitler in 1939 — detained at Sachsenhausen until he was shot on 9 April 1945.
- Philippe Pétain, the leader of Vichy France — detained at Schloss Sigmaringen after September 1944, nominally as head of the French government-in-exile.
- Geneviève de Gaulle-Anthonioz, the niece of Charles de Gaulle — detained at Ravensbrück concentration camp.
- Princess Mafalda of Savoy, the daughter of King Victor Emmanuel III of Italy — held at Buchenwald and killed in an Allied air raid in 1944.
- Miklós Horthy, Regent of the Kingdom of Hungary — arrested in 1944 for lack of cooperation with Nazi Germany and held at Schloss Hirschberg.
- Leopold III, King of Belgium and his family — detained for lack of cooperation with Nazi Germany, first at the Royal Castle of Laeken, then at Hirschstein in Saxony from June 1944 to March 1945, and then at Strobl, Austria.
- Benito Mussolini, the former Fascist leader of Italy — was briefly detained with his family at Schloss Hirschberg after his rescue in the Gran Sasso raid, before being sent back to Italy to lead a German puppet state.
- Martin Niemöller, a notable German Lutheran pastor and anti-Nazi theologian — detained at Sachsenhausen and Dachau concentration camp.
- Francesco Saverio Nitti, the former Prime Minister of Italy — detained at Hotel Ifen.
- Stepan Bandera, the far-right leader of the Organization of Ukrainian Nationalists (OUN) – imprisoned in a Nazi concentration camp, but was released by the German officers in hopes of fighting against the advance of the Soviet Red Army, in September 1944.
- Wilhelm, German Crown Prince, Head of the House of Hohenzollern and Crown Prince of Prussia — placed under house arrest and had his home at Cecilienhof surveilled.
- Friedrich Leopold, Prince of Hohenzollern.
- Louis Ferdinand, Prince of Prussia.
- Kira Kirillovna, Princess of Prussia.
- The family of Rupprecht von Bayern, Crown Prince of Bavaria.
- Albert Sarraut, the former Prime Minister of France — detained at Hotel Ifen.
- Kurt Schuschnigg, the former Chancellor of Austria — detained at Sachsenhausen with his wife and children, who joined him voluntarily.
- Horia Sima, leader of the Romanian Iron Guard — detained first at Buchenwald and later Sachsenhausen. Released in August 1944 to lead a Romanian puppet government.
- André François-Poncet, former French ambassador in Berlin, imprisoned in the Ifen Hotel in Kleinwalsertal, Austria
- French ex-Prime Minister Édouard Daladier, Itter Castle, Tyrol
- French trade union leader Léon Jouhaux, Itter Castle, Tyrol
- French general Maurice Gamelin, Itter Castle, Tyrol

== See also ==
- Festungshaft
- Sippenhaft § Nazi Germany
