= Alphonse Joseph Georges =

French army general

- Georges in 1939
- Born: 15 August 1875; Allier, Montluçon, France
- Died: 24 April 1951 (aged 75); Paris, France
- Education: École Spéciale Militaire de Saint-Cyr
- Military career
- Allegiance: France
- Branch: French Army
- Service years: 1897–1944
- Rank: General
- Wars and battles: World War I; Rif War; World War II; Battle of France; North African campaign

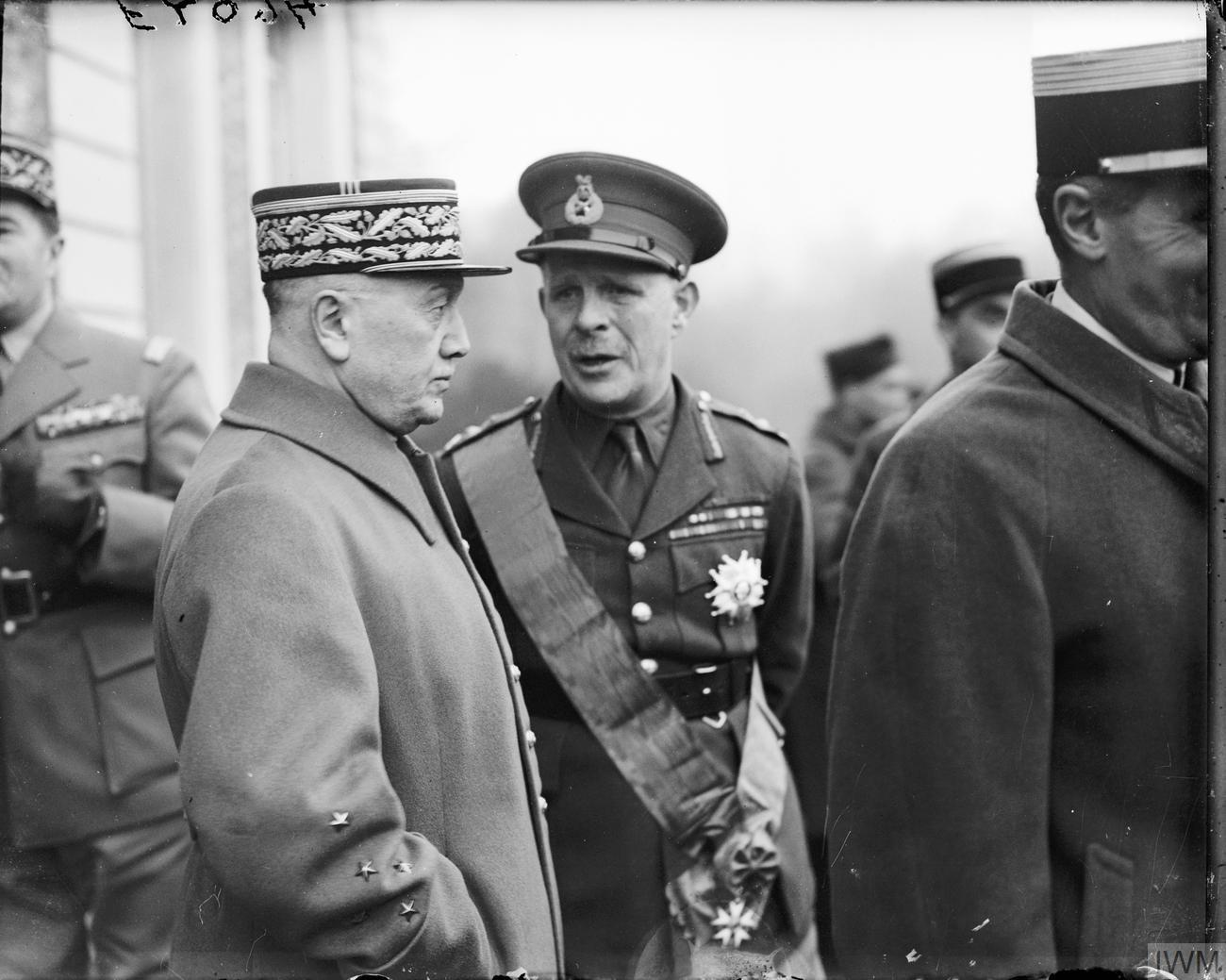
General Georges, left, with General Lord Gort at Arras, c. 1940

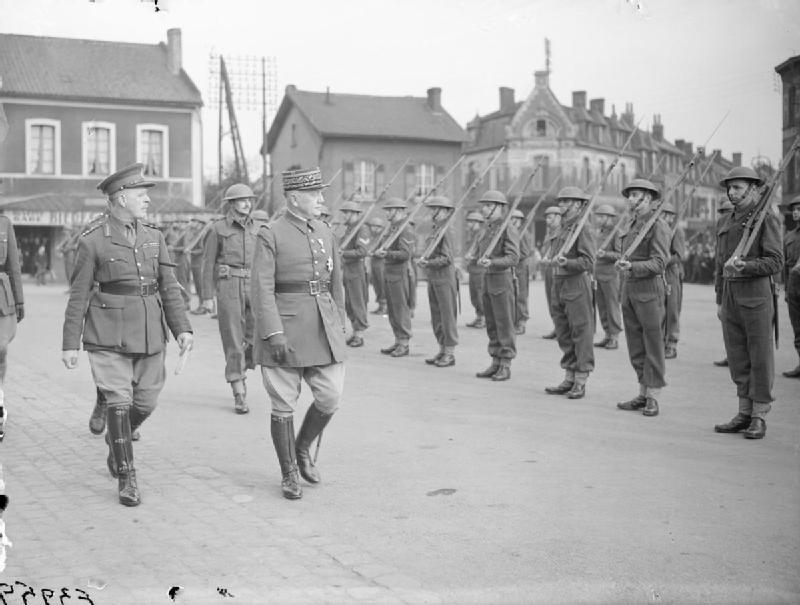
General Georges accompanied by General Lord Gort, commander-in-chief of the British Expeditionary Force (BEF), inspecting men of the 2nd Battalion, Royal Inniskilling Fusiliers, British 5th Division, at Béthune, France, 23 April 1940

Alphonse Joseph Georges (French pronunciation: [alfɔ̃s ʒozɛf ʒɔʁʒ]; 15 August 1875 – 24 April 1951) was a French army officer. He was commander in chief of the North-Eastern Front in 1939 and 1940. Opposing the plan by supreme commander Maurice Gamelin to move the best Allied forces into the Low Countries, he was overruled. Georges tried to allow as much initiative to his subordinates as possible to improve operational flexibility.

== Early career ==
Georges entered the École Spéciale Militaire de Saint-Cyr and graduated third in his class in 1897. He served in French Algeria with a tirailleur regiment.

== First World War ==
He served in the French Army during the First World War and was seriously wounded while he was leading his battalion in 1914. He was then assigned to the general staff of the army, where he remained for the rest of the war.

== Interwar period ==
In 1918, Georges served under General Ferdinand Foch as operations chief. He was also chief of staff under Marshal Henri-Philippe Pétain in French Morocco during the 1920–1926 Rif War and as a division commander in Algeria (1928–1932).

Georges was appointed to the Supreme War Council in November 1932. Based in Paris, he witnessed the assassination of French Foreign Minister Louis Barthou and King Alexander I of Yugoslavia in Marseille on 9 October 1934. Seriously wounded, Georges had a long recovery but was expected to succeed General Maxime Weygand as head of the French Army in 1935. The Prime Minister, however, thought he was too right-wing and appointed General Gamelin instead.

== World War II ==
Georges was appointed as Gamelin's deputy, but they had a mutually-hostile relationship. On the outbreak of the Second World War in September 1939, Georges became commander of all French field armies. Gamelin and Georges assured Daladier that France had the greatest army in the world and were shocked when the Allied front was broken through at Sedan by the Wehrmacht. According to the memoirs of Captain André Beaufre, after the front was broken, the feeling was rife in Georges's headquarters staff that the battle with the Germans had been lost, with Beaufre himself witnessing Georges breaking into tears. On 19 May 1940, both Gamelin and Georges were dismissed, and General Weygand returned as head of the French Army.

Once Marshal Pétain took power after the fall of France and the collapse of the French Third Republic, Georges refused to play any significant role in the new Vichy France government. Winston Churchill wanted Georges to become commander of French forces in Algeria, Morocco, and Tunisia after the invasion of North Africa in November 1942. In that aim, Churchill was unsuccessful. Franklin Roosevelt insisted for the post go to General Henri Giraud instead.

In January 1943, Giraud and General Charles de Gaulle became co-presidents of the French Committee of National Liberation (CFLN). Georges was appointed minister without portfolio, but well before the end of the year, he, like Giraud, was ousted by de Gaulle. Thereafter he took no part in politics. He died in 1951.
