= Grand Quartier Général (1914–1919) =

French Army's World War I headquarters

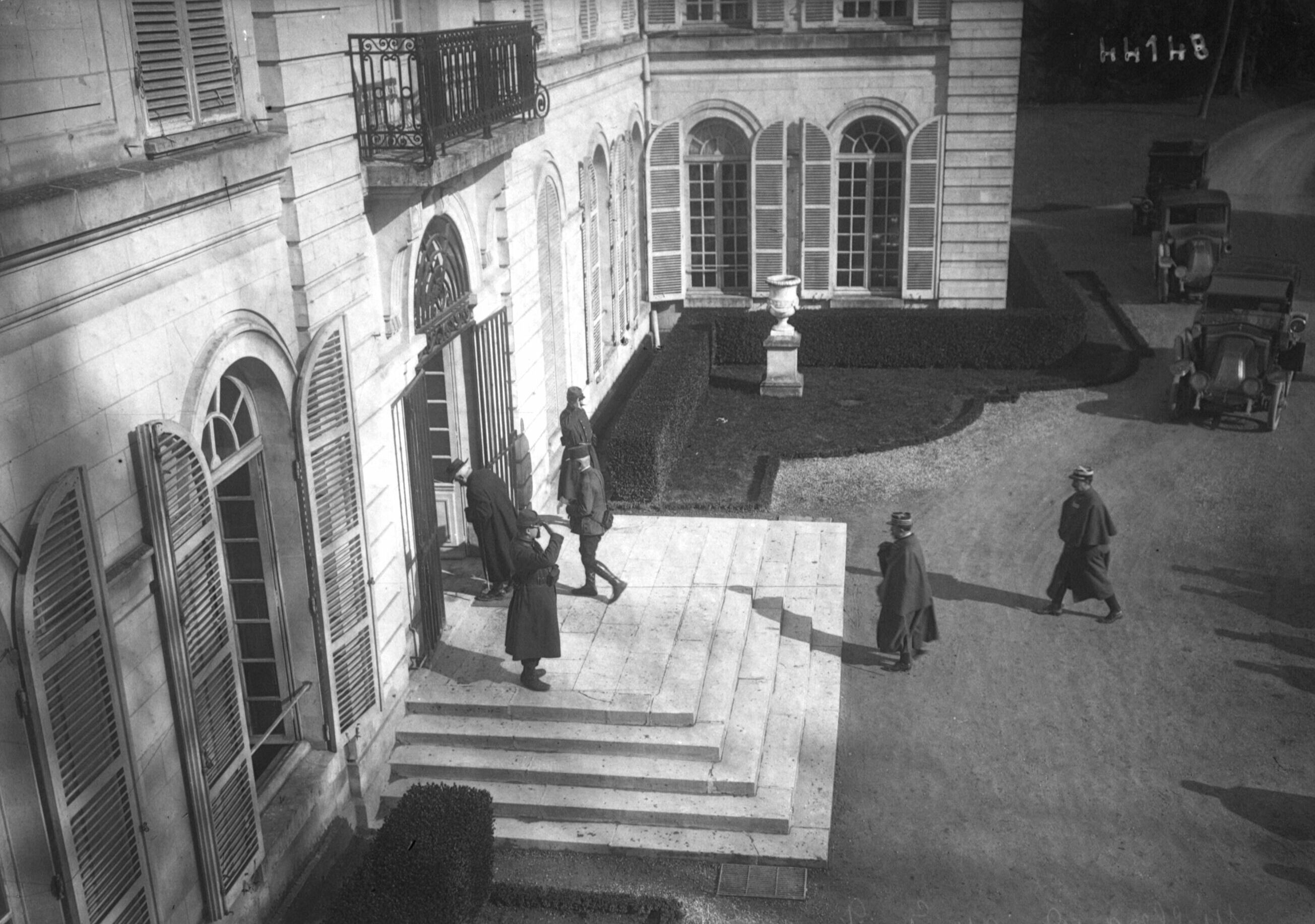
- Minister for War Alexandre Millerand arriving at the Chantilly Grand Quartier Général building in February 1915
- Active: 2 August 1914 – 20 October 1919
- Country: France
- Branch: French Army
- Role: General headquarters
- Coordinates: 49°11′26″N 2°27′53″E (Chantilly)
- Nickname: GQG or Grand QG

Commanders
- 1914–1916: Joseph Joffre
- 1916–1917: Robert Nivelle
- 1917–1919: Philippe Pétain

The Grand Quartier Général (abbreviated to GQG or Grand QG in spoken French) was the general headquarters of the French Army during the First World War. It served as the wartime equivalent of the Conseil supérieur de la guerre and had extensive powers within an area defined by the French parliament. The GQG was activated by parliament on 2 August 1914, after the violation of French borders by German military patrols, and remained in existence until 20 October 1919.

GQG was commanded by the chief of staff, assisted by a varying number of subordinate generals, and had representatives to the French government and president. The headquarters of GQG was originally at Vitry-le-François in the Marne department but rapid German advances in the early stages of the war forced its withdrawal to the Hôtel du Grand Condé in Chantilly, north of Paris, by November 1914. It remained there for much of the rest of the war. General Joseph Joffre served as the first chief of staff of GQG from the start of the war until December 1916, when he was replaced by General Robert Nivelle. Nivelle in turn was replaced in May 1917, after the failure of his spring offensive, by General Philippe Pétain, who retained command of GQG until its dissolution in 1919. In April 1918 the Grand Quartier Général des Armées Alliées (GQGA) was established under General Ferdinand Foch as an equivalent organisation with authority for Allied operations in France.

GQG was organised into a complex series of departments and bureaux that changed frequently throughout the war. This structure has been criticised by historians for failing to encourage co-operation between departments and for widespread infighting. There were also concerns about the autonomy and power vested in GQG. French policy, laid down in 1913, had been for the two most important field armies, the north and north-east, to retain operational independence. GQG, under Joffre, assumed control of these armies in December 1915 and retained them until his replacement by Nivelle when the Minister of War, Joseph Gallieni, raised concerns that the pre-war policy was being violated. GQG failed accurately to assess German casualties, basing military operations on wildly optimistic assessments of the weakness of German units and reserves.

== Origins and structure ==
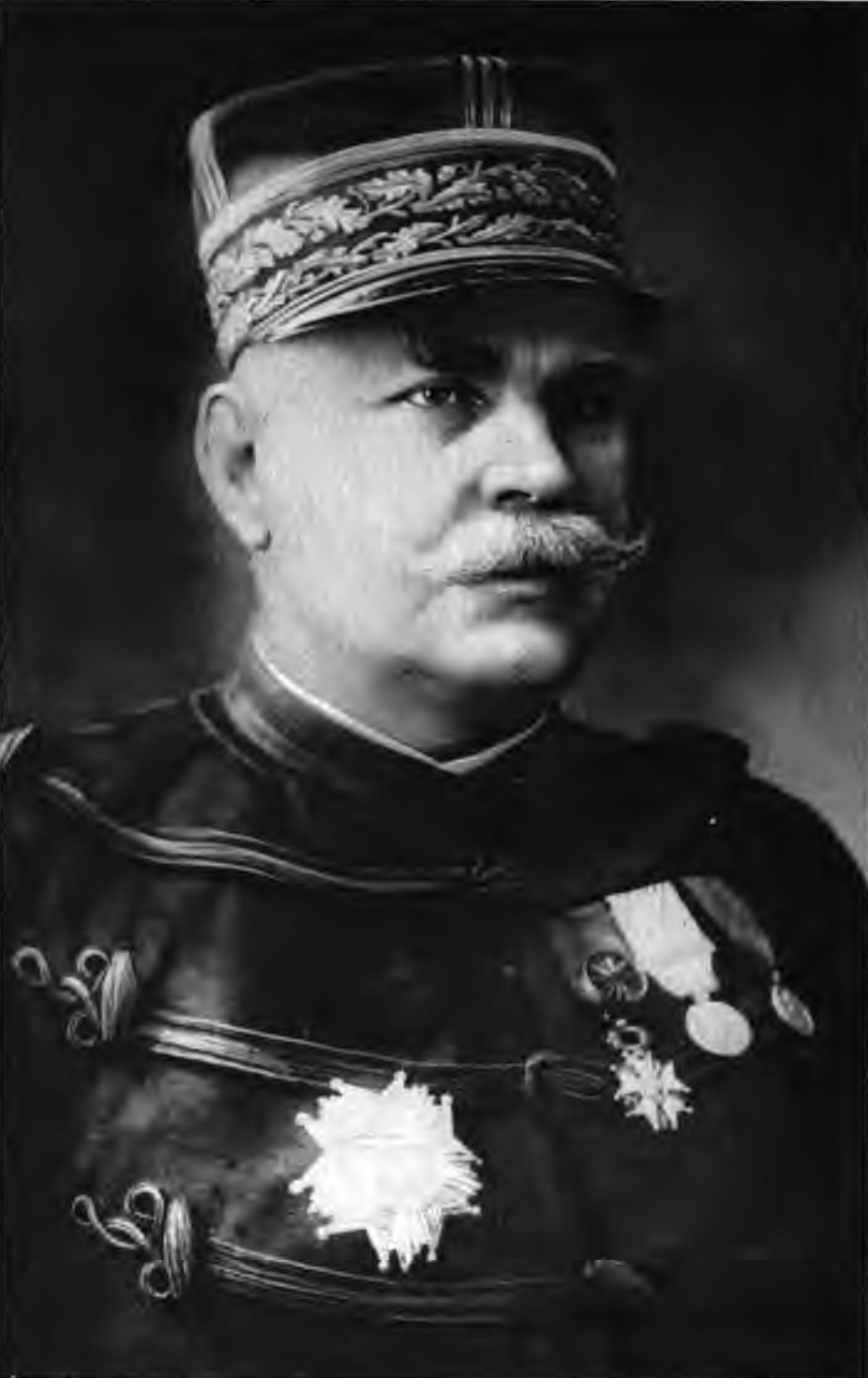
General Joffre chief of staff from 1911 and head of the GQG from 1914 to 1916

The Grand Quartier Général had its origins in the reforms instituted by France after their defeat in the Franco-Prussian War. The position and supporting staff, of the Chief of Staff of the French Army was created with responsibility for training and mobilisation in peace and the formation of the army high command in times of war. The establishment of GQG in 1911 formalised this situation, with GQG becoming the wartime counterpart of the Conseil supérieur de la Guerre (CSG) and the vice-president of CSG becoming the chief of staff of the GQG. The GQG received extensive military powers within an area defined as the zone of army control; control of the remainder of the armed forces was retained by the Minister of War. GQG was activated upon the mobilisation of the French Army by Parliament, who also defined the zone of army control.

The chief of staff was assisted by an état-major-général, who ran the GQG general staff of around 50 officers and saw that the commander-in-chief's orders were carried out and two aides-majors with responsibilities for the individual departments of GQG. GQG was originally organised into four bureaux (or departments). The First Bureau was responsible for organization, personnel and equipment; the Second Bureau for intelligence, information and political affairs; the Third Bureau for the planning of military operations and the Fourth Bureau (sometimes called the Direction de l'Arrière – Directorate of the Rear [lines]) for transport, communication and supply.

The Third Bureau was considered by far the most powerful as it had control of active military operations. Its staff consisted mainly of liaison officers, embedded with individual unit headquarters. Though these officers were junior in rank to the generals commanding the armies, they held significant power over their careers through the reports made on their operations to GQG. One officer from the Third Bureau liaised with the French government and another with the president and they were said to wield "considerable political power". The Fourth Bureau had a wide remit, with responsibility for the management of military railways, motor vehicles, water transport, financial offices, post offices and telegraphy and its chief was sometimes called the directeur de l'arrière (director of the rear [lines]). In addition GQG was responsible for co-ordination with allied armies.

== First World War ==
=== Activation of GQG ===
A French poster declaring general mobilisation, published 2 August 1914

The French Chief of Staff, General Joseph Joffre, was convinced of the inevitability of the outbreak of the First World War and, on 30 July 1914, began organising the personnel for his GQG staff. Joffre persuaded the French government to enact mobilisation on 1 August and at 14.00 the next day parliament, following the violation of the French borders by German military patrols, gave Joffre full wartime powers and activated the GQG. The zone of army control was initially limited to just 8 departments of France, but on 10 August was expanded to 33 departments out of 86 in Metropolitan France. In this area Joffre was the absolute authority and no civilian, not even President Poincaré or his ministers, could enter it without his permission. Joffre used this authority to exclude the press and his own government's parliamentary commission on military affairs from his zone of control.

Upon activation the major-général of GQG was General Émile Belin and the two aides-majors were General Henri Berthelot and General Céleste Deprez. Each aide-major had responsibility for two of the bureaus; Berthelot oversaw the Second and Third Bureaus, Deprez oversaw the First and Fourth Bureaus. Each bureau was under the day-to-day control of a lower ranking officer, upon activation the Third Bureau was headed by Colonel Ferdinand Auguste Pont, the Fourth Bureau by General Édouard Laffon de Ladébat and the president's liaison officer was General Jean-Baptiste Pénélon. The other officers were generally selected by Joffre from those who had excelled at the Ecole Supérieure de Guerre (French Army staff college). Representatives from the allied powers were also present within the GQG structure and at various times included officers from the United Kingdom, Russia, the United States, Japan, Italy, Belgium, Serbia and Romania.

The GQG established its physical headquarters at Vitry-le-François, in the Marne department, on 5 August. The location had been chosen as it was halfway between Paris and Nancy and roughly equidistant (at around 80 to 90 miles) to the headquarters of each of the five French armies. The staff occupied a school building with the second bureau located in the classrooms and the third bureau in the gymnasium, with the sports equipment pushed up against one wall. The staff at GQG had the use of a detachment of the 8th Engineer Regiment, a company of the 19th Train Squadron, two companies of the 68th Territorial Infantry Regiment, a company of Forestry Chasseurs, two anti-aircraft sections, up to two carrier pigeon units, a unit of cyclist messengers, a medical detachment and a military police escort squadron.

=== GQG during the war ===
A contemporary depiction of Joffre and his staff at the Châtillon-sur-Seine GQG on the night of 6 September 1914, during the First Battle of the Marne

GQG played a key role at the start of the war. Due to illness Belin had delegated much of his role to Berthelot, further increasing the power of his influential Third Bureau. The officers in that department, particularly the recent staff college graduates who were known as the Young Turks, favoured strong offensive action. Having failed to initially perceive the German advance through Belgium, it was these officers who were key in persuading Joffre to attack the exposed German right flank during the Great Retreat from Mons. As a result of the German advances in late 1914, GQG was forced to relocate its headquarters progressively westwards. It moved to Bar-sur-Aube on 31 August, Châtillon-sur-Seine on 6 September, Romilly-sur-Seine on 28 September 1914 and, on 29 November, to Chantilly, within the Paris metropolitan area, where it was to remain for the next few years. This location was suited to GQG operations due to its proximity to the seat of government and the ministries in Paris.

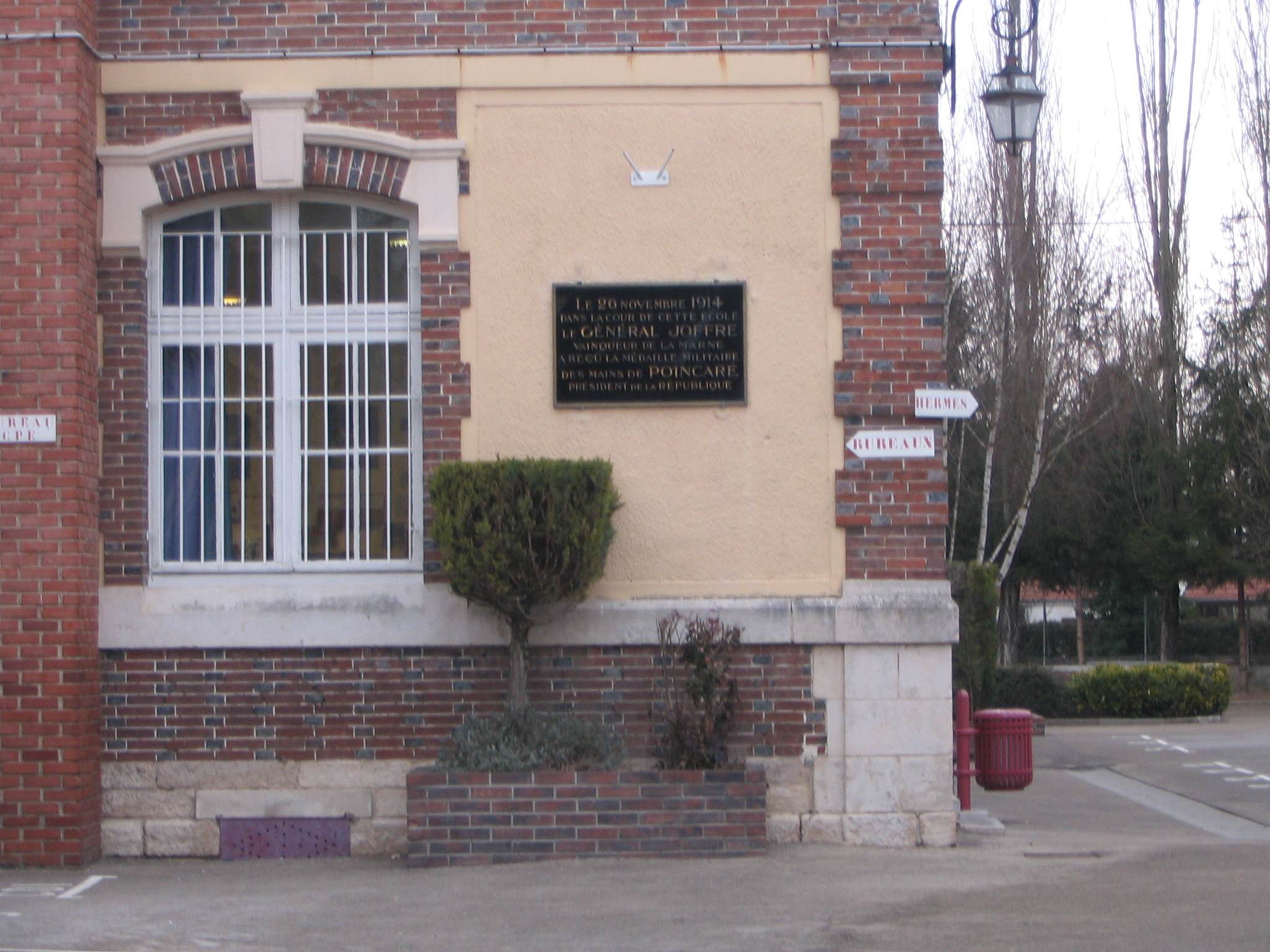
A modern photograph of the GQG headquarters at Romilly-sur-Seine, a school, with plaque commemorating the awarding of the Médaille militaire to Joffre on 26 November 1914 by President Raymond Poincaré

Joffre found his new command difficult; while he was able to dismiss army commanders at will (he limogered 54 generals by the time of the First Battle of the Marne) he seemed unable to remove officers from GQG. The reasons for Joffre's lack of action are unknown but historian Alistair Horne speculated that it was due to the vast power granted to the GQG staff or to Joffre's desire not to be upstaged by his staff. The GQG officers, isolated from the direct effects of the war, engaged in intrigue on a grand scale and there was little co-operation between the rival departments. The Second Bureau was often incapable of estimating the strength of the German forces committed to action. At the start of the war it took until 24 August for the Second Bureau to realise that each German army corps deployed alongside a correspondingly numbered reserve corps, effectively doubling the strength of that corps in the field. Throughout the war it maintained an inadequate means of calculating German casualty figures, simply assuming that for each two Frenchmen killed in battle three Germans must have fallen. In reality the figures were almost the reverse. By means of such estimations they calculated that Germany would run out of manpower reserves by early 1916. Thus the Third Bureau found itself directing French generals to undertake military operations based on wholly inaccurate assessments of the strength of opposing units.

French set-backs in 1915 forced Joffre to reorganise GQG—on 11 December he replaced Belin with General Noël de Castelnau—and expand its remit. Three entirely new bureaus were formed, that of the North Army (Armée du Nord), the North-East Army (Armée du Nord-Est) and for external theatres of war bringing GQG direct control of French armies in the field. Two major-générals were appointed, General Maurice Janin for the two army bureaus and General Maurice Pellé for the Bureau for External Theatres of War. The Second Bureau was also reformed with its censorship, counter-espionage and intelligence gathering duties being passed to a new Fifth Bureau; though the Second Bureau retained some of its former intelligence responsibilities.

Despite this reorganisation GQG remained dysfunctional with the Second Bureau, described as "perennial optimists" by Horne, again responsible for providing deceptive assessments of German casualties, at one point in the Battle of Verdun simply adding "a hundred thousand or thereabouts" every fortnight to the figures. The confused responsibility for intelligence between the Second and Fifth Bureaus, the Ministry of the Interior and the police also led to delays in providing intelligence to the armies in the field during the battle. The Third Bureau was responsible for withdrawing two and a half batteries of artillery from the fortresses of Verdun in the months leading up to that close-fought battle, despite receiving requests for reinforcements from the local commander General Frédéric-Georges Herr, who stated he could not hold if attacked in force.

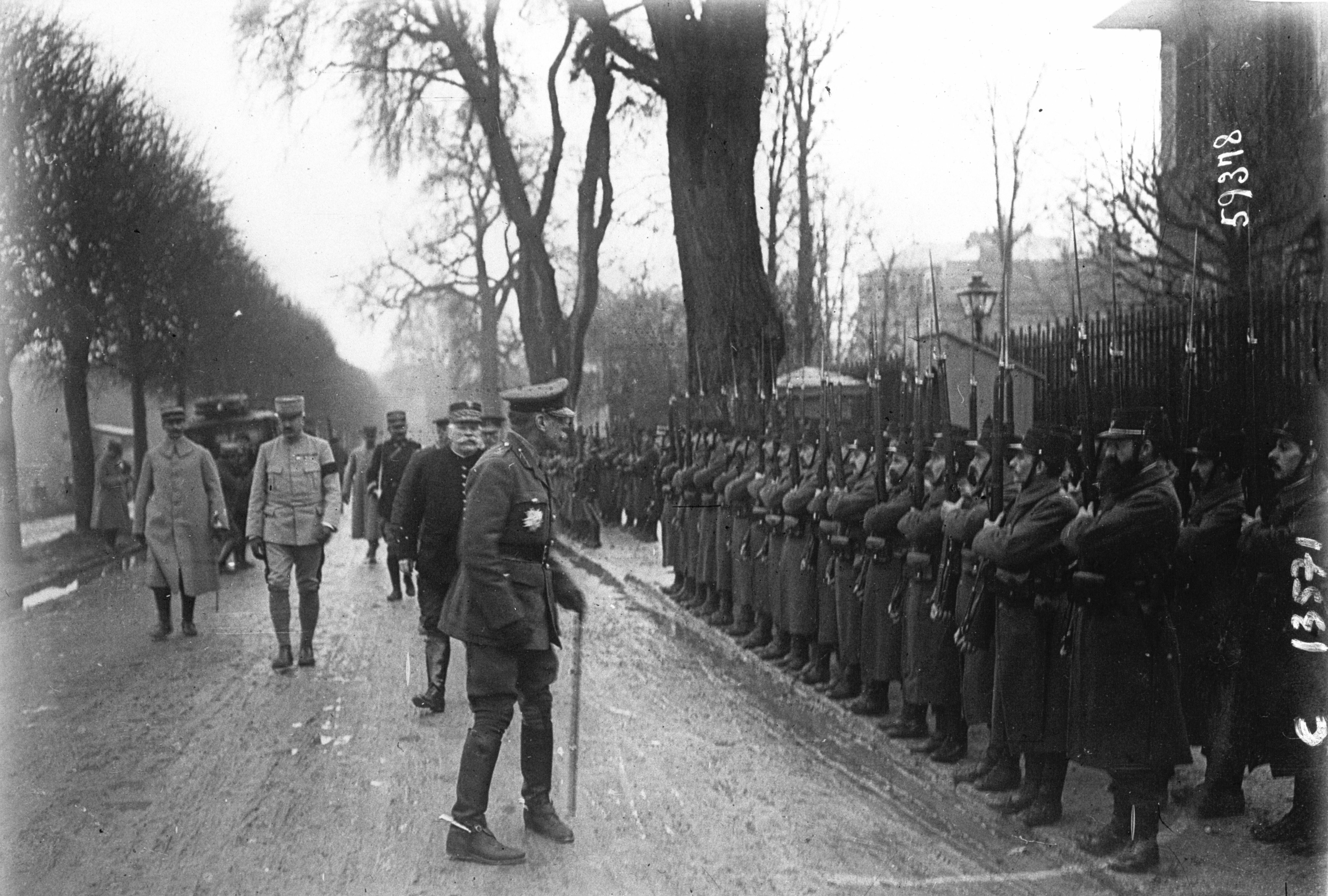
Joffre and British General Douglas Haig inspecting French troops outside of GQG in Chantilly in 1916

The autonomy and power afforded to GQG worried Minister for War Joseph Gallieni and after his death, one of his successors, Hubert Lyautey, ordered a reorganisation of GQG by ministerial decree on 13 December 1916. Joffre was "promoted" to a position as "technical adviser to the government" and was replaced by General Robert Nivelle. Such was Joffre's fall from grace that, entitled to take three staff officers from GQG with him to his new post, he could find only one volunteer. Finding he had actually been sidelined and left with few defined responsibilities, he resigned on 27 December 1916. The North Army and North-East Army were also removed from the direct control of GQG. This course of action was justified by the Ministry of War as an essential step in restoring the independence of the two armies, a key pre-war policy that had been established in a ministerial decree on 28 October 1913.

Nivelle ordered his own reorganisation on 1 January 1917, returning control of external theatres to the Ministry of War. In February the 2nd and 5th Bureaus were re-united, though there remained an informal division and intense rivalry between the officers of the "old" and "new" 2nd Bureau. This division remained until the arrival of Georges Clemenceau as Prime Minister and Minister of War in November 1917.

Nivelle moved the GQG headquarters forward to Beauvais in Picardy on 10 January and to Compiègne in Oise on 4 April. At this stage the GQG staff numbered 450 officers and 800 enlisted personnel. However, the failure of the Nivelle Offensive of April 1917 led to his downfall and replacement by General Philippe Pétain on 17 May. Pétain expanded GQG's operations, establishing a new Section for Relations with the Civil Authorities and a Bureau for Aeronautics, Telegraphy and Aviation. He later reformed the Second Bureau, absorbing into it the newly formed section for relations with the civil authorities and a new responsibility for cryptography. A minor change in February 1918 saw the expansion of the Third Bureau, gaining telegraphy and liaison from the Bureau for Aeronautics and cryptography from the Bureau for Special Services. In March the Bureau for Aeronautics gained control of anti-aircraft matters and the army medical departments under their own Bureau of Health Services. This organisation would last until after the armistice with Germany in 1918.

At 19.00 on 16 February 1918 the offices of the Third Bureau on Algiers Street in Compiègne were hit by a bomb from a squadron of three German bombers. Serious damage was caused to the building and two officers were killed, Commandant Mathis and Captain Mallet. The dead officers were buried at the Saint-Jacques Church in Compiègne. Fourteen additional officers were injured by flying glass, two of whom were hospitalised.

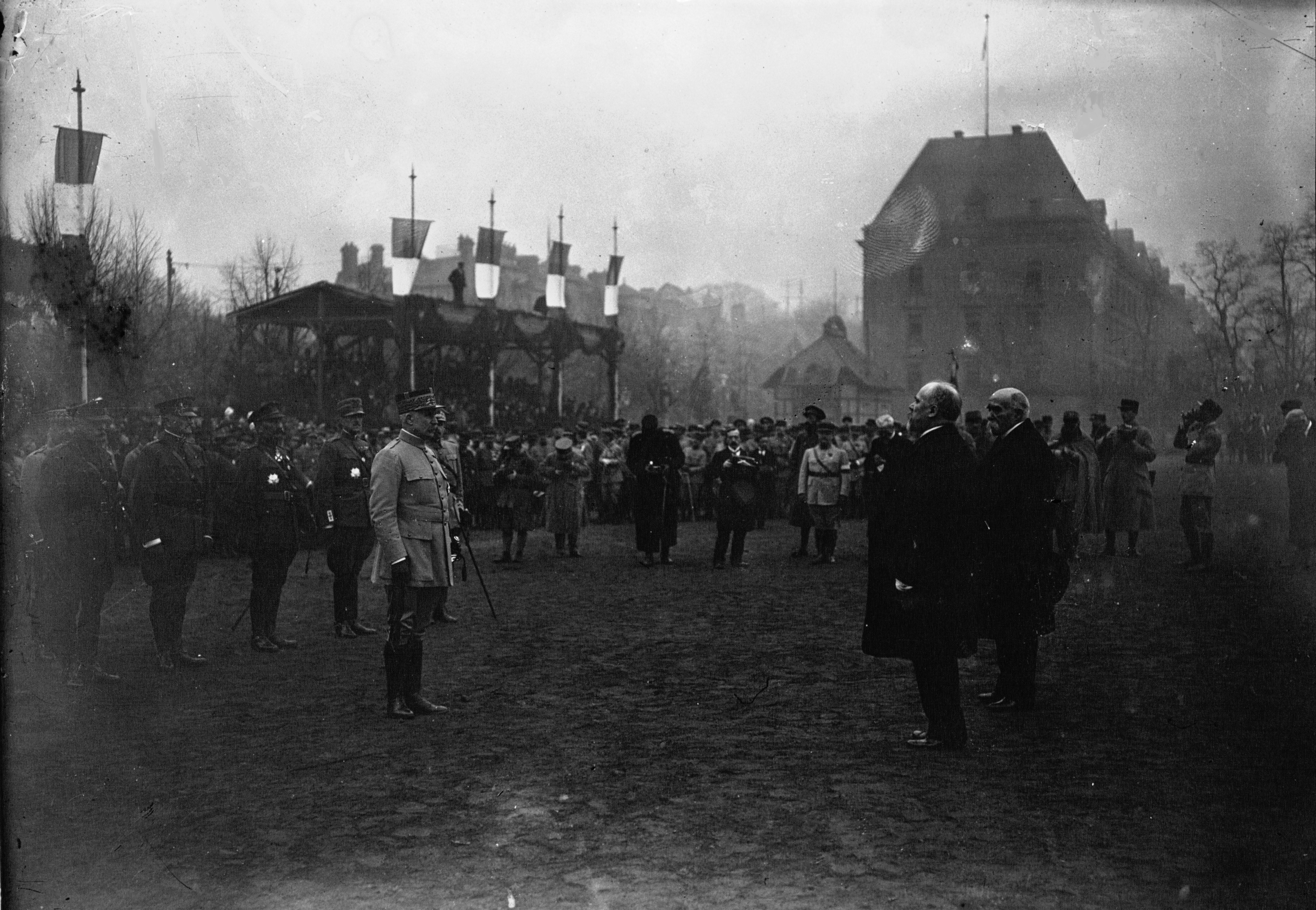
President Poincaré with Pétain in Metz in 1918

The GQG headquarters moved further eastwards to Provins in Seine-et-Marne on 26 March 1918. After the armistice GQG moved to Metz in the newly reacquired Moselle department on 1 December 1918 and returned to Chantilly on 29 January 1919. GQG was dissolved on 20 October 1919 in accordance with a request from the War Ministry on 14 October which also abolished the zone of army control. The powers previously delegated to GQG were returned to the chief-of-staff of the army. During the Second World War the German army took control of the GQG First World War archives and sent many of the most secret documents to Berlin for analysis. These documents were recovered by the USSR at the end of the war and taken back to Moscow for processing. They were not returned to France until after the dissolution of the Soviet Union in the 1990s.

Equivalent bodies in the other nations of the war were the General Headquarters (GHQ) of the British, Italian and American armies, the Oberste Heeresleitung of the German army and the Stavka of the Russian forces. Though one was allowed for in the constitution, the Japanese army did not operate a General Headquarters during the war. After April 1918 all Allied troops on the Western Front were placed under the command of the Grand Quartier Général des Armées Alliées (GQGA), a multi-national general staff that developed from the Supreme War Council. The GQGA was on similar lines to the GQG and came under General Ferdinand Foch, who had overall command of all Allied troops.

=== Evolution of responsibilities ===
Responsibility	August 1914	After 11 December 1915	13 December 1916	1 January 1917	February 1917	After 17 May 1917		February 1918	March 1918
Organisation, personnel and equipment	1st Bureau								
Information	2nd Bureau						Bureau for Special Services		
Intelligence gathering, censorship and counter-espionage	2nd Bureau	5th Bureau			2nd Bureau		Bureau for Special Services		
Relations with the civil authorities	n/a					Section for Relations with the Civil Authorities	Bureau for Special Services		
Cryptography	n/a						Bureau for Special Services	3rd Bureau	
Military operations	3rd Bureau								
Telegraphy and liaison	n/a					Bureau for Aeronautics, Telegraphy and Liaison		3rd Bureau	
Aeronautics	n/a					Bureau for Aeronautics, Telegraphy and Liaison		Bureau for Aeronautics	
Anti-aircraft	n/a								Bureau for Aeronautics
Transportation, communication and supply	4th Bureau – sometimes called the Direction de l'Arrière (Directorate of the Rear)								
North Army	Independent	Bureau for the North Army	Independent						
North-East Army	Independent	Bureau for the North-East Army	Independent						
External theatres of war	Ministry of War	Bureau for External Theatres of War		Ministry of War					
Health services	n/a								Bureau for Health Services
