= Conseil supérieur de la guerre =

French military organization

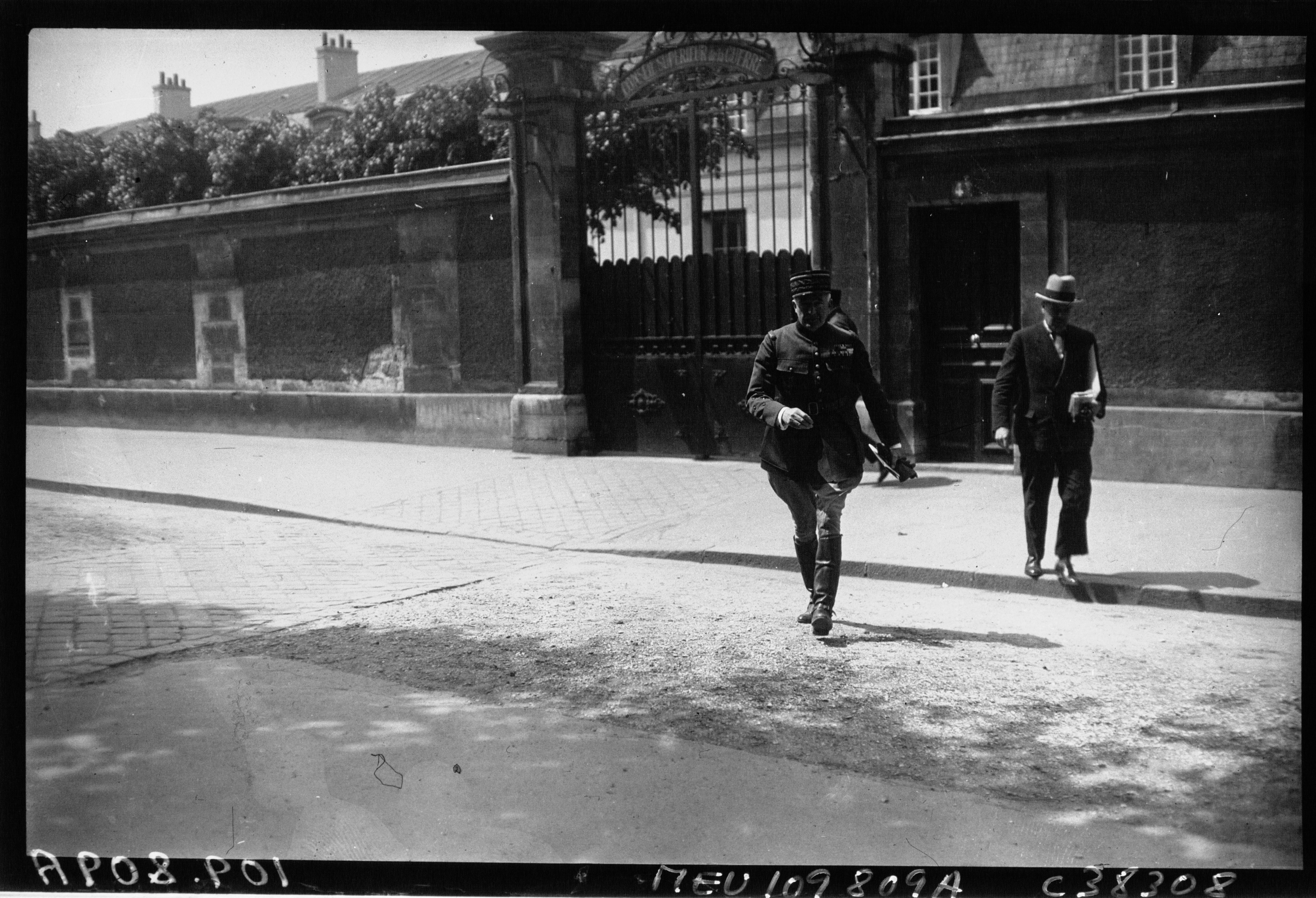
Conseil Supérieur de la Guerre, 1934

The Conseil supérieur de la guerre (French pronunciation: [kɔ̃sɛj sypeʁjœʁ də la ɡɛʁ], Supreme War Council, abbr. CSG) was the highest military body in France under the Third Republic. It was under the presidency of the Minister of War, although vice presidents presided in his absence and took care of day-to-day activities. On 5 December 1889, a corresponding Conseil supérieur de la Marine (CSM) for naval affairs was created, and in April 1931 a Conseil supérieur de l'Air (CSA).

The CSG was created by President Adolphe Thiers by executive decree on 27 July 1872. It is not to be confused with the Conseil de Défense created on 29 June 1872, which was charged with planning the construction of fortifications and was composed solely of military officers. In 1888, the minister of war, Charles de Freycinet, merged the Conseil de Défense into the CSG. The original CSG had twenty-two members both civilian and military. It was to restructure the army to accommodate the new recruitment law (loi de recrutement). It did not originally have anything to do with war plans, which were the responsibility of the Conseil de Défense. Prior to 1888, the CSG rarely met.

In July 1888, the CSG was reconstituted by an executive decree that set out its various committees and their responsibilities. When the Chief of the General Staff of the Army (Chef d'État-Major Général de l'Armée) was created in May 1890, its holder became the only ex officio member of the CSG and in charge of war planning. (Note: This was a transformation of the general staff (created 1874) into a permanent, non-partisan body.) The office of vice president was formalized in 1903, resulting in a power struggle between the vice presidents and the chiefs of staff. Finally in 1911, the offices were merged, so that the chief war planner in peacetime would also have operational command of the army upon mobilization. The first vice president with combined powers was Joseph Joffre, who also appointed a separate army chief of staff beneath him (Auguste Dubail). This separate army chief of staff was suppressed in 1912.

Following the First World War (1914–18), the offices of vice president of the council and chief of the general staff were separated again by decrees of 23 January 1920 and 18 January 1922. In January 1935, the situation of 1911–12 was restored: an army chief of staff (chef d'état-major de l'armée) was appointed to act under the vice president of the council, who was also chief of the general staff.

== List of vice presidents ==
- Félix Gustave Saussier (1889–1897)
- Edouard Ferdinand Jamont (1898–1900)
- Joseph Brugère (1900–1906)
- Alexis Hagron (1906–1907)
- Henry de Lacroix (1907–1909)
- Charles Trémeau (1909–1910)
- Victor-Constant Michel (July 1910 – July 1911)
- Joseph Joffre (July 1911 – August 1914)
- Ferdinand Foch (1919–1920)
- Philippe Pétain (January 1920 – February 1931)
- Maxime Weygand (February 1931–1935)
- Maurice Gamelin (1935–1940)
