= Operation Royal Marine =

Military operation

- Part of the Second World War
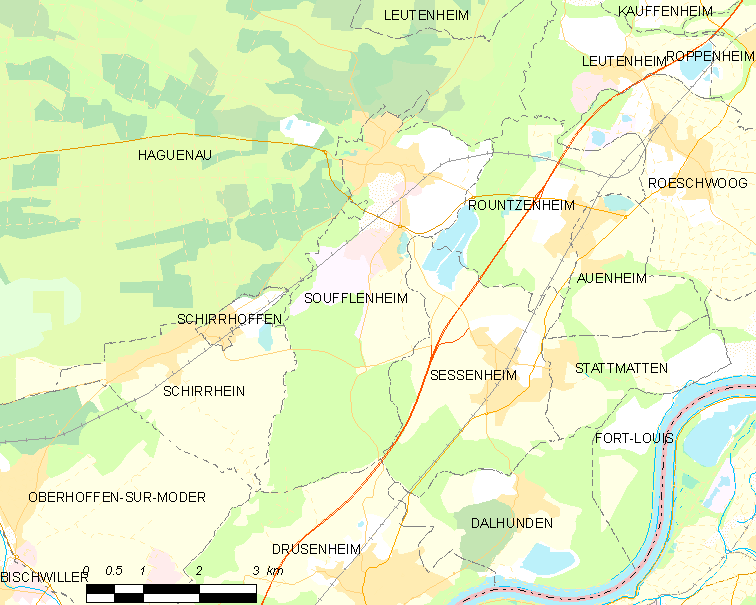
- Soufflenheim and vicinity
- Operational scope: Tactical
- Location: Rhine, Moselle, Meuse rivers 48°50′N 7°58′E
- Planned by: Winston Churchill
- Commanded by: Commander G. R. S. Wellby
- Objective: Obstructing German rivers and canals with fluvial mines
- Date: May 1940
- Executed by: Military Intelligence Research [MIR(c)], Royal Navy parties
- Outcome: Temporary suspensions of German river traffic and damage to barge barriers and bridges
- Soufflenheim, a commune in the Bas-Rhin department of north-eastern France

Operation Royal Marine was a military operation in May 1940 of the Second World War, during the Battle of France (10 May – 25 June 1940). The British floated fluvial mines down rivers which flowed into Germany from France. The plan was to destroy German bridges, barges and other water transport. After several postponements insisted on by the French government, fearful of German retaliation, the operation began on 10 May 1940, when the German offensive in the west began.

The mines caused some damage and delay to German river traffic on the Rhine from Karlsruhe to Koblenz and damaged bridges and protective barriers. Part of the plan was for Royal Air Force (RAF) bombers to drop the mines into rivers and canals on moonlit nights but this had hardly begun when the campaign ended. The success of the plot was nullified by the Allied defeat and the Franco-German Armistice of 22 June 1940.

== Background ==
Despite the concerns of the French government during the Phoney War, over German air attacks and reprisals against French waterways, it was intended that the operation would take place simultaneously with Operation Wilfred, a scheme to mine the waters around Norway. The novelty of Operation Royal Marine was intended to divert American attention from the possible illegality of Operation Wilfred. Wilfred was to force German convoys transporting Swedish iron ore into international waters, where they could be attacked by the Royal Navy.

Simultaneous attacks with fluvial (river) mines against Germany was intended to deflect criticism that the Allies were not making war on Germany but the small countries around it, that they claimed to be protecting. A decision of the Anglo French Supreme War Council was taken on 28 March 1940 to commence Operation Royal Marine on 4 April and the air-dropping of mines on 15 April. The decision was vetoed shortly afterwards by the French War Committee, a ruling which was not rescinded for about three months. Operation Wilfred was left to take place on its own on 5 April and was then postponed to 8 April, later parts of the plan being cancelled when news arrived that the German fleet had sailed. The British and French were able to agree that Operation Royal Marine could begin as soon as the German offensive in the west commenced.

== Prelude ==
=== Plan ===
Course of the Rhine (Post-1945 borders of Germany.)

The plan had been presented to the British Cabinet in November 1939 by Winston Churchill, as a means of retaliation against illegal German minelaying. (Sir Edward Spears claimed that he had originally proposed the idea to Churchill, when they visited eastern France in August 1939 but by the time the operation began, Churchill believed the idea to be his.) A stock of 2,000 fluvial mines, with 1,000 more being produced per week, were to be put into rivers in France that flowed into western Germany, by naval parties led by Commander G. R. S. Wellby. The sailors were to be based in the Maginot Line, about 5 mi (8.0 km) distant from the Rhine, to put mines in the river, interfering with commercial traffic for 100 mi (160 km) beyond Karlsruhe.

The mines would sabotage barge traffic and other river craft but become inert before reaching neutral territory at the Netherlands border. On 6 March 1940, the Cabinet was notified that mines would be ready for release from riverbanks on 12 March and to be dropped by RAF bombers by mid-April, between Bingen am Rhein and Koblenz on moonlit nights. Neutrals were to be warned and the first 300–400 fluvial mines were ready by the night of 14/15 March; after French objections for fear of German retaliation, the plan was postponed. In April, Churchill tried to persuade the French to drop their objections to Royal Marine and remarked after meeting the French Prime Minister, Édouard Daladier, "Nous allons perdre l'omnibus".

=== Mines ===
The mines were specially developed for the operation by Ministry of Defence 1 (MD1, Churchill's Toyshop), a British weapon research and development organisation. The mine, known as the 'W' Bomb, was designed by Millis Jefferis, who had received the request for the device on 10 November and had completed the first demonstration model by 24 November. A delayed-action fuze based on a soluble chemical pellet was devised by Jefferis' assistant, Stuart Macrae, using an Alka-Seltzer tablet, which was found to dissolve at a predictable rate. Each mine contained 15 lb (7 kg) of Trinitrotoluene (TNT). Trials of the mines were carried out in the Thames in December 1939 and depending upon type, either floated or bounced along the riverbed. Because Jefferis' department only consisted of three people at the point, the trials had to be conducted with the help of a boat crewed by local Sea Scouts, who followed the mines after they had been dropped from Chiswick Bridge. Over 20,000 'W' Bombs were produced in the course of the war.

== Operation ==
On 10 May 1940, mines were released into the Moselle to destroy pontoon bridges built by German army engineers; other mines were put into the Rhine to negligible effect. On 13 May, the British put 1,700 mines in the Rhine near Soufflenheim, reported by General Victor Bourret, the Fifth Army commander, to have caused damage to the barge barrier protecting the bridge at Karlsruhe. Several pontoon bridges were damaged and river traffic was temporarily suspended between Karlsruhe and Mainz. By 24 May, over 2,300 mines had been released into the Rhine, Moselle and Meuse rivers. On 9 June, Général d'Armée André-Gaston Prételat, commander of Groupe d'Armée 2, ordered the fluvial mines to be sent down the Rhine to delay a German attack on the Maginot Line. RAF Bomber Command mine dropping began between Bingen and Koblenz and into canals and river estuaries feeding the Heligoland Bight but few mines were laid by aircraft before the Battle of France ended; any damage caused could not be measured.

== Aftermath ==
In Assignment to Catastrophe (1954), Edward Spears, the representative of Churchill to the French Prime Minister, Paul Reynaud, who had first mooted the mining of German rivers in 1939, quoted Churchill from Their Finest Hour (1949) that,

The success of the device was, however, lost in the deluge of disaster.
