= Joseph Vuillemin =

French professional soldier

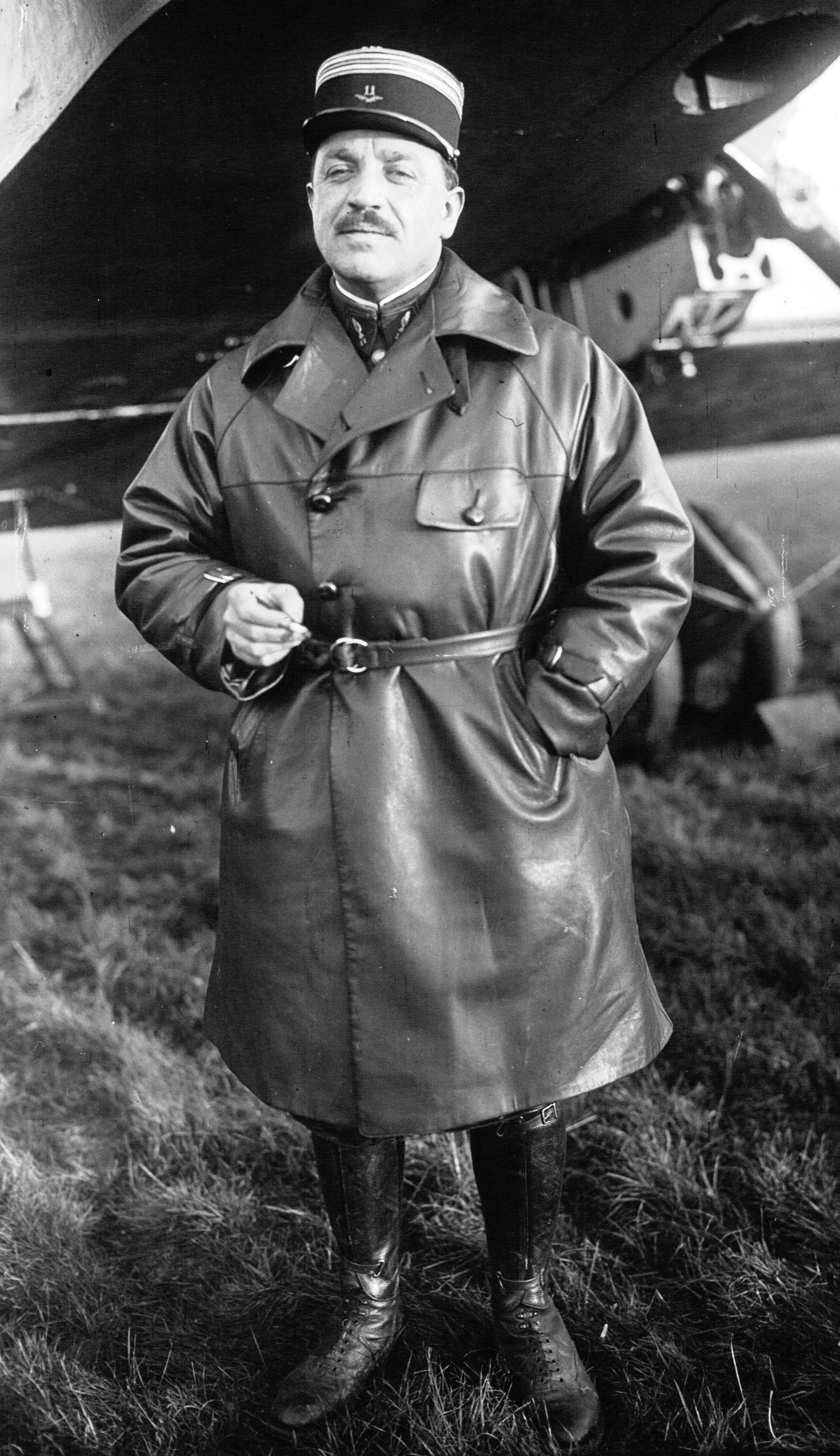
- Vuillemin in 1925
- Born: 14 March 1883; Bordeaux, France
- Died: 23 July 1963 (aged 80); Lyon, France
- Military career
- Allegiance: France
- Branch: French Air Service
- Service years: 1904–1940
- Rank: 8 March 1933 : Général de Brigade; 1 April 1933 : Général de Brigade Aérienne; 14 October 1936 : Général de Division Aérienne; 15 October 1936 : Rank and prerogatives of Regional Air Commander; 24 June 1939 : Général d'Armée Aérienne; 24 June 1939 : Commander in Chief of the Air Force
- Other work: Career in military aviation

General Joseph Vuillemin (14 March 1883 – 23 July 1963) was a French professional soldier whose early interest in aviation led him into increasingly responsible leadership positions in the Aeronautique Militaire during World War I. Ending the war with extensive decorations, including an unusual double award of the Legion d'honneur, as well as seven aerial victories, he became a dynamic leader of an aerial expedition to Africa in 1933. His climb through the ranks continued until World War II, when he became Chief of Staff of the French Air Force during the first year of World War II.

== Early life and entry into military ==
Joseph Vuillemin was born in Bordeaux, France, on 14 March 1883. He began his mandatory military service in November 1904 as an artilleryman. Remaining past his prescribed term of service, he became an Aspirant on 1 October 1909, and was commissioned Sous lieutenant exactly a year later. On 1 October 1912, he was promoted to Lieutenant. He was detached from his regimental duties to attend aviation training on 1 July 1913. On 28 November 1913, he received his Military Pilot's Brevet, and was returned to his regiment. Vuillemin became a flying instructor at Reims; when World War I began, he was sent to Escadrille C.11 as a Caudron bomber pilot.

== First World War ==
On 14 September 1914, Vuillemin was appointed to the Legion d'honneur as a Chevalier, following his participation in the First Battle of the Marne. On 10 March 1915, he was temporarily posted to Escadrille C.39, where he was Mentioned in dispatches. After a temporary promotion to Capitaine on 28 June 1915, he was returned to Escadrille C.11. He shot down a German plane on 12 September 1915 for his first aerial victory, with another coming on 30 March 1916. On 4 April 1916, his rank as Capitaine was confirmed. On 28 October 1916, he was raised to Officier in the Legion d'honneur. His citation read:

"A pilot of remarkable skill. At the front since the war began, he has never ceased to gain the admiration of his comrades and his seniors by his valor, spirit and disdain for danger. He has had more than 60 aerial combats, downed three enemy planes, carried out numerous night bombardments. He has given the most brilliant service to his country during the course of recent operations. Cited five times in orders." Chevalier de la Legion d'Honneur citation, 28 October 1916

The Aeronautique Militaire was aggregating its squadrons into wings dubbed Groupes de Combat or Groupes de Bombardement, these wings usually consisting of four escadrilles; these groups were also being accumulated by fours into Escadres. On 20 February 1918, Commandant Vuillemin was jumped to the command of Escadre 12. By mid-summer, he had devised the tactic of using three-place Caudron R.11s as protective gunships for bomber raids. With expert gunners manning the aircraft's five machine guns, the R.11 fended off attacking German fighters, inflicting heavy casualties and preventing much injury to their own side.

By the time of the ceasefire on 11 November 1918, Joseph Vuillemin's military career was exemplary. Besides the unusual wartime double award of France's highest honor, the Legion d'honneur, he had earned the Croix de Guerre with 10 palmes, three etoiles de vermeil, and two etoiles de argent. Along the way, he had accounted for seven German airplanes shot down. Escadre 12, which he had led from its inception, was twice Mentioned in dispatches and was entitled to wear the Fourragere of the Croix de guerre.

== Inter-war years ==
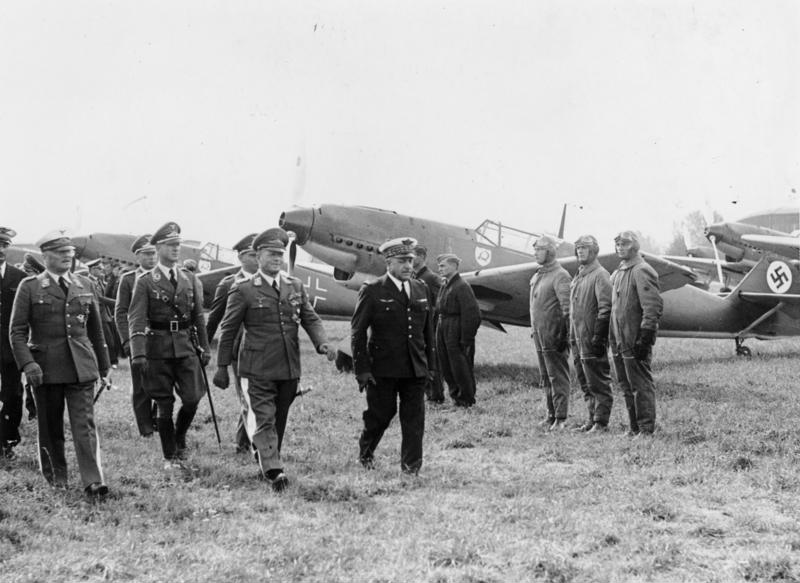
General Vuillemin official visit to Germany before the 2nd World War reviews of Messerschmitt Bf 109.

After the war he took part in a number of pioneering flights in Africa. On 18 February 1920 Vuillemin and his observer, Lieutenant Chalus, complete the first flight across the Sahara Desert from Ramanrasset to Ménaka. He was later given command of the ‘11e régiment d’aviation de bombardement en pays rhénan’ (11th Bomber Wing of the Rhine), and then put in charge of air operations in Algeria in 1925. He became a colonel in 1928 and assumed command of air operations in Morocco in 1932.

In February 1933, he was promoted to brigadier general (the equivalent of air commodore in the RAF). Between November 1933 and January 1934, he led the so-called ‘La Croisière noire aérienne’ – an ambitious training and trailblazing mission from France via Morocco and the Sahara to French West Africa and French Equatorial Africa using French Potez 25 biplanes.

Between 1935 and 1936, he commanded the ‘1er corps aérien’ (1st Air Corps) and, in July 1937, became a member of the ‘Conseil supérieur de l’air’ (Supreme Air Council) before being promoted to ‘général de division aérienne’ (equivalent of air vice-marshal in the RAF) in October of the same year.

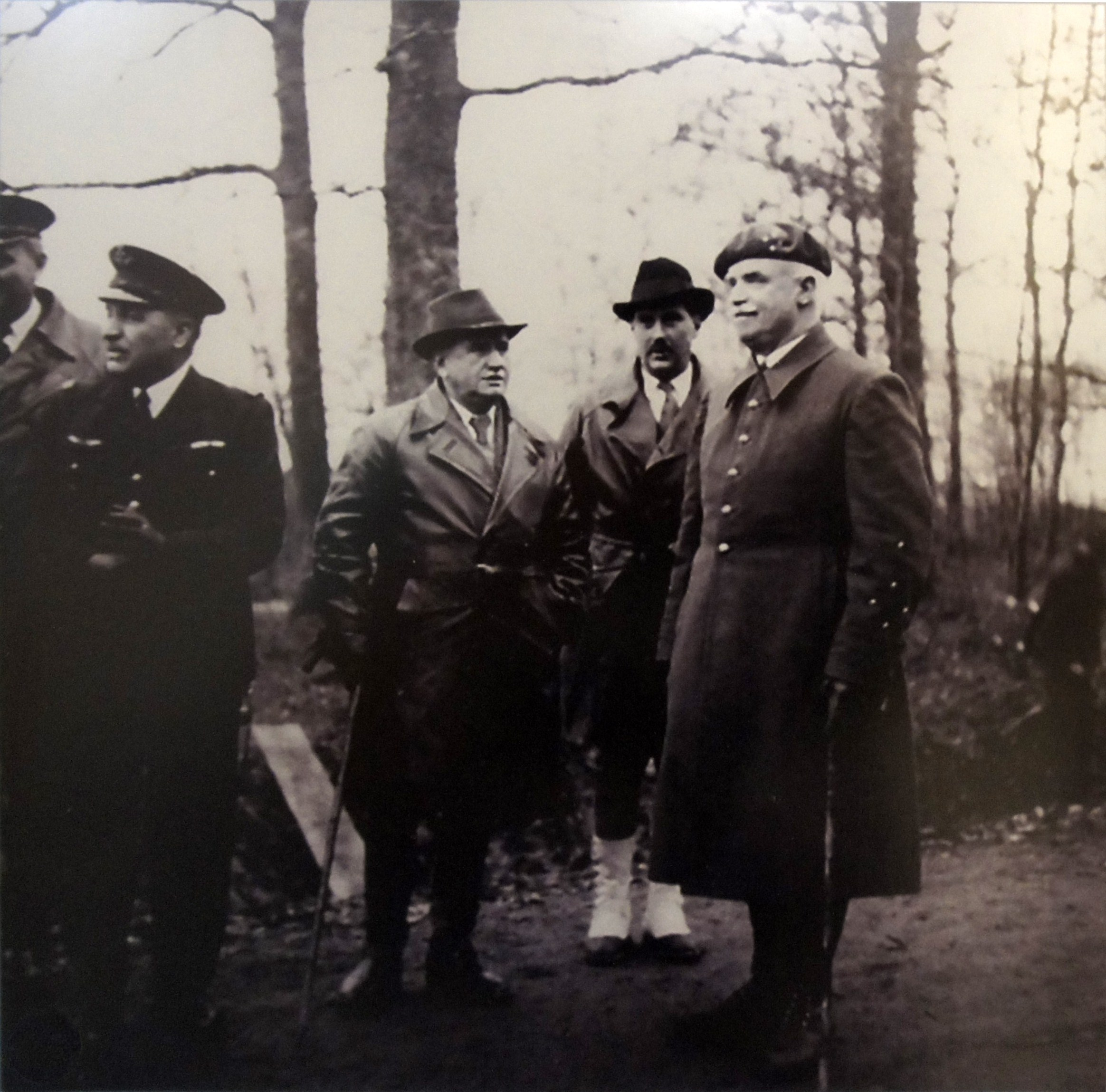
Vuillemin (left) with Édouard Daladier and General Victor Bourret on 12 November 1939.

At the same time as his appointment to Chief of Staff of the French air force on 18 February 1938, General Vuillemin became ‘vice-président du Conseil supérieur de l’air’ (Vice Chairman of the Supreme Air Council) and Inspector General of Home Air Defence. He was further promoted to the rank of ‘general d’armée aérienne’ (equivalent of air chief marshal in the RAF).

== Second World War ==
At the outbreak of the Second World War, he became Chief of the Air Staff, a post he would hold until the Armistice with France (Second Compiègne) in June 1940. During the Battle of France, General Vuillemin repeatedly called for more British squadrons to come to the aid of French forces which were under severe attack from the German Luftwaffe. Commenting to General Edward Spears on 30 May 1940, the British Air Attaché in Paris, Air Commodore Douglas Colyer, criticised certain senior French officers saying that, while they had been very brave pilots in the last war, they were not sufficiently educated to command important formations now. In Colyer's view, included among these was General Vuillemin.

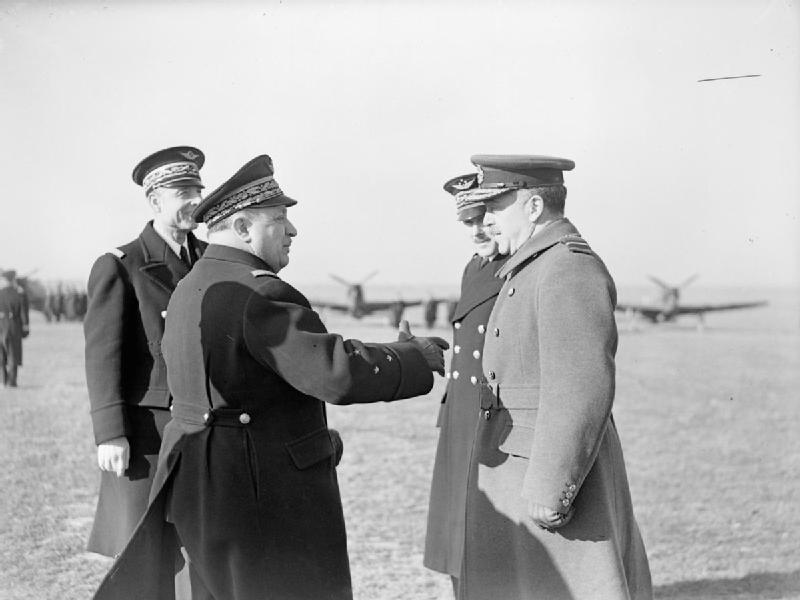
Vuillemin talks with Air Marshal A S Barratt.

On 12 June 1940, at a meeting of the Anglo French Supreme War Council at Briare, it was reported that a bombing raid by the RAF against Italy the previous day had been thwarted by General Vuillemin, who had ordered lorries to be driven onto the airfield as the bombers were preparing for take-off. He feared that such raids would provoke Italian reprisals, the consequences of which would be disastrous, as the French Air Force was not present in the south. Vuillemin requested that no raids be launched against targets in northern Italy unless these were carried out in response to attacks by the Italians. General Spears, who was present at the conference in his capacity of Winston Churchill's personal representative to the French Prime Minister, wondered why 'if he had bombers to bomb back in retaliation, why not use them now?'

On 24 June 1940, Vuillemin was named Inspector General of the Air Force and given responsibility for the co-ordination of air defence operations. In November 1940, at his own request, he was removed from the active list of serving air force officers.

He died in Lyon on 23 July 1963.

== Ranks (approximate British equivalents) ==
- 8 March 1933 : Général de Brigade
- 1 April 1933 : Général de Brigade Aérienne (Air Commodore)
- 14 October 1936 : Général de Division Aérienne (Air Vice Marshal)
- 15 October 1936 : Rank and prerogatives of Regional Air Commander (Air Marshal)
- 24 June 1939 : Général d'Armée Aérienne (Air Chief Marshal) (retrospective effect from 1 July 1937)
- 24 June 1939 : Commander in Chief of the Air Force (retrospective effect from 22 February 1938)

== Decorations ==
=== French decorations ===
- Légion d'honneur
  - Chevalier - 8 September 1914
  - Officier - 28 October 1916
  - Commandeur - 1 May 1920
  - Grand Officier - 2 July 1931
  - Grand-Croix - 13 January 1934
- Médaille militaire - 17 July 1940
- Croix de Guerre 1914–1918 (France)
- Croix de Guerre des théâtres d'opérations extérieures avec 1 palme
- Médaille Interalliée de la Victoire
- Médaille commémorative de la guerre 1914–1918
- Médaille Coloniale with « Sahara » « Afrique " bars

=== Significant foreign decorations ===
- Morocco: Commandeur du Ouissam Alaouite Chérifien
- United Kingdom: Distinguished Service Order, Royal Victorian Order
- Tunisia: Grand Officier du Nicham iftikhar

The above is largely a translation of the article in the French Wikipedia fr:Joseph Vuillemin
