= Alexander Spiers =

English lexicographer

Alexander Spiers (1807–1869), was an English lexicographer.

== Life ==
Spiers, was born at Gosport in Hampshire in 1807. He studied in England, in Germany, and in Paris and graduated doctor of philosophy at the University of Leipzig. Acting under the advice of Andrieux, a well-known poet, he settled in Paris as a professor of English, and found employment at L'École de Commerce, at L'École des Ponts et Chaussées, at L'École des Mines, and at the Lycée Bonaparte.

Spiers was nominated an Agrégé de l'Université (roughly, a professorship), an Officier de l'Instruction Publique (officer of the Education Minister), Examinateur à la Sorbonne, and Inspecteur Général de l'Université. He received the cross of the Legion of Honour from Napoleon III.

He married in 1853 Victoire Dawes Newman, by whom he left five sons. He died at Passy, near Paris, on 26 Aug. 1869.

== English-French dictionary ==
For fourteen years he devoted himself largely to compiling a new English-French and French-English dictionary. It appeared in 1846 as General English and French Dictionary, newly composed from the English dictionaries of Johnson, Webster, Richardson, &c., and from the French dictionaries of the French Academy, of Laveaux, Boiste, (London, 1846). It proved superior to anything which had preceded it, and was at once ‘autorisé par le conseil de l'instruction publique’, 3 July 1846. The twenty-ninth edition, in two volumes, appeared in 1884 (remodelled by H. Witcomb, Spiers's successor at the École des Ponts et Chaussées), and it remained for a long time a standard dictionary. Both Ralph Waldo Emerson and John Muir owned copies. An abridgment, under the title of Dictionnaire abrégé Anglais-Français et Français-Anglais, abrégé du Dictionnaire Général de M. Spiers, was brought out in 1851 and supplied to almost every school and lycée in France.

In November 1857 he brought an action against Léon Contanseau and his publishers, Longmans & Co., for violating the copyright of his dictionaries in a work entitled A Practical Dictionary of the French and English Languages’ but Vice-chancellor Sir William Page Wood (afterwards Lord Hatherley), in his decision on 25 February 1858, said that, although great use of Spiers's books had been made without due acknowledgement, yet in regard to such publications, which were not entirely original, a charge of piracy could not be sustained.

Major General Sir Edward Louis Spears, 1st Baronet (1886–1974) was his grandson, who had changed his name from Spiers to Spears.

== Works ==
Besides his Dictionary, Spiers's chief publications were:

1. Manual of Commercial Terms in English and French, 1846.
2. Study of the English Prose Writers, Sacred and Profane, 1852.
3. Treatise on English Versification, 1852.
4. The English Letter-Writer, 1853.
5. Study of English Poetry, a choice collection of the finest pieces of the poets of Great Britain, 1855.

All these works were issued in both English and French editions in London, Paris, and America (New York or Philadelphia). Spiers also printed and edited for French students Sheridan's The School for Scandal and The Essays of F. Bacon, Viscount St. Albans (1851).
