= Edward Spears =

British Army officer and Member of Parliament

Major-General Sir Edward Spears Bt KBE CB MC
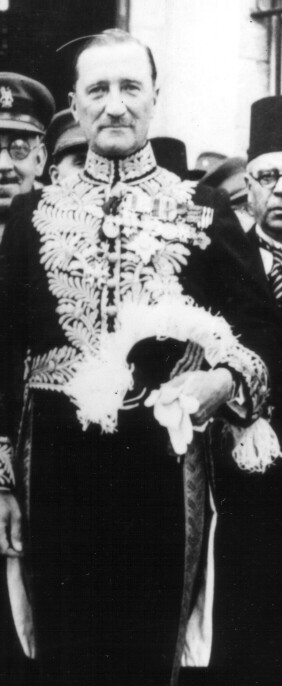
- Spears in court uniform, c. 21 May 1942
- Born: 7 August 1886; Passy, Paris, France
- Died: 27 January 1974 (aged 87); Ascot, England
- Spouse: Mary Borden-Turner
- Military career
- Allegiance: United Kingdom
- Branch: British Army
- Service years: 1903–1919; 1940–1946
- Rank: Major-General
- Unit: 8th Hussars
- Conflicts: First World War; Second World War
- Awards: Knight Commander of the Order of the British Empire; Companion of the Order of the Bath; Military Cross; Mentioned in Despatches; Knight of the Legion of Honour (France)
- Other work: Chairman of Ashanti Goldfields (1945–71); Chairman of Institute of Directors (1948–66)

Member of Parliament for Carlisle
- In office 27 October 1931 – 15 June 1945
- Preceded by: George Middleton
- Succeeded by: Edgar Grierson

Member of Parliament for Loughborough
- In office 15 November 1922 – 9 October 1924
- Preceded by: Oscar Guest
- Succeeded by: Frank Rye

Major-General Sir Edward Louis Spears, 1st Baronet, KBE, CB, MC (7 August 1886 – 27 January 1974) was a British Army officer and politician. He served as a liaison officer between British and French forces during both World Wars. From 1917 to 1920, he was head of the British Military Mission in Paris, concluding the First World War as a brigadier-general. Between the wars, he was a Member of the House of Commons of the United Kingdom. During the Second World War, he resumed his role as an Anglo-French liaison officer, holding the rank of major-general.

== Family and early life ==
Spears was born on 7 August 1886 at 7 Chaussée de la Muette in the Passy district of Paris. His parents, Charles McCarthy Spiers and Melicent Marguerite Lucy Hack, were British residents of France. His paternal grandfather, Alexander Spiers, was a lexicographer known for publishing an English-French and French-English dictionary in 1846, which was widely used in French colleges.

During his childhood, his parents separated, and his maternal grandmother played a significant role in his upbringing. He moved frequently with his grandmother, including to Menton, Aix-les-Bains, Switzerland, Brittany, and Ireland. As an infant, he contracted diphtheria and typhoid and was considered physically delicate. However, after two years at a boarding school in Germany, his health improved, and he became a strong swimmer and athlete. His friends referred to him by the name Louis.

In 1918, Spears changed the spelling of his surname from Spiers to Spears. He stated that this change was due to frequent mispronunciations of his original name, though it has been suggested that he sought a name that appeared more English, particularly given his rank as a brigadier-general and his position as head of the British Military Mission to the French War Office. He denied having Jewish ancestry, but his great-grandfather, Isaac Spiers of Gosport, was married to Hannah Moses, a shopkeeper from the same town. His ancestry was known at the time; in 1918, the French ambassador in London referred to him as "a very able and intriguing Jew who insinuates himself everywhere".

== Army service before First World War ==
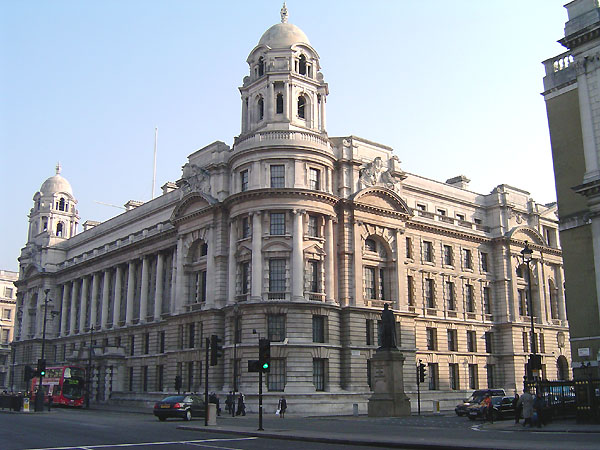
Old War Office Building in London. It was here that Spears worked with French counterparts developing a joint Anglo-French codebook.

In 1903, Spears joined the Kildare Militia, the 3rd Battalion of the Royal Dublin Fusiliers. He acquired the nickname "Monsieur Beaucaire", a reference to the protagonist of a novel by the same name. The nickname remained with him, used by both of his wives, with his first wife often shortening it to "B."

In 1906, he was commissioned into the regular army with the 8th Royal Irish Hussars. That same year, he published a translation of Lessons of the Russo-Japanese War, a book by a French general. His upbringing, which involved instruction from a series of tutors, had not prepared him for socializing in military circles, and he struggled to adapt to life in the officers' mess. He was known to be tactless and argumentative, often positioning himself as an outsider—something that characterized much of his life.

In 1911, Spears worked at the War Office on the development of a joint Anglo-French codebook. He continued his interest in military translations, publishing Cavalry Tactical Schemes, another translated French military text, in 1914. In May of that year, he was sent to Paris to work at the French Ministry of War, tasked with establishing contact with British agents in Belgium.

With the outbreak of World War I in August 1914, Spears left Paris for the front on the orders of his colonel at the War Office. He later claimed that he was the first British officer to reach the front lines.

== First World War ==
=== Linguistic barriers ===
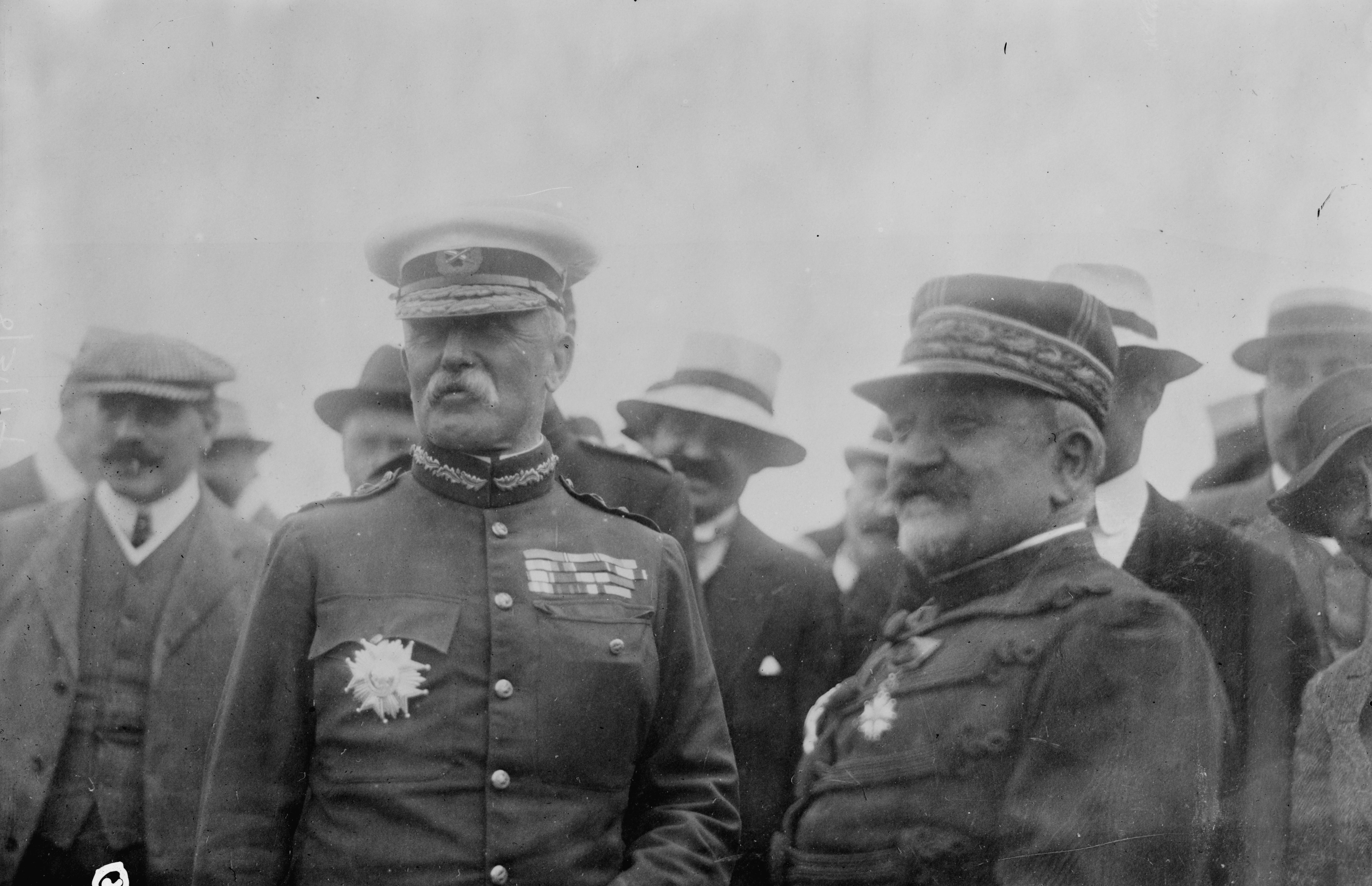
Field Marshal French in Paris

Language barriers significantly hindered cooperation between the British and French armies during World War I, with many officers lacking proficiency in each other's languages. British soldiers who had difficulty pronouncing French place names developed their own versions of these names. French place names also posed difficulties for senior officers. In the spring of 1915, Spears was instructed to pronounce French place names in an anglicized manner so that General Sir William Robertson, the newly appointed Chief of Staff, could understand them.

On the French side, few commanders were fluent in English. In this linguistic environment, the bilingual Spears played a significant role. Despite holding the junior rank of lieutenant in the Hussars, he established connections with senior British and French military and political figures, relationships that would later prove influential in his career.

=== Early liaison work ===
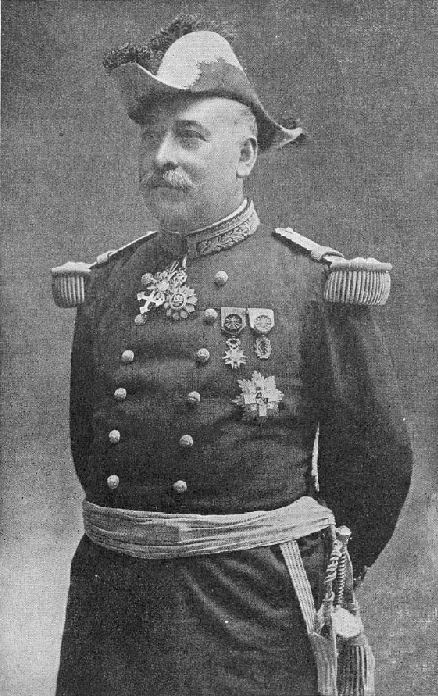
General Charles Lanrezac

On 14 August 1914, Spears was sent to the Ardennes to act as a liaison between Field Marshal Sir John French and General Charles Lanrezac, commander of the French 5th Army. His role was complicated by Lanrezac’s secrecy and dismissive attitude toward the British. With the German advance moving rapidly, allied commanders had to make quick decisions without consultation, while their constantly relocating headquarters made coordination difficult. To relay crucial information, Spears traveled by car between headquarters on roads crowded with refugees and retreating troops. Telephone communications were unreliable, with Spears describing frequent delays; on occasion, he was mistakenly connected to advancing German forces. In such cases, he attempted to pose as a German to gather intelligence, but his language skills were insufficient to maintain the deception.

==== An army is saved ====
On 23 August 1914, General Lanrezac abruptly decided to retreat, a move that would have left the British flank exposed. Spears relayed this information to Sir John French just in time, saving the army. The next day, he urged Lanrezac to counterattack, warning that if his decision led to the destruction of the British Army, England would never forgive France, and France, in turn, would not be able to afford to forgive him.

In September, Spears again asserted himself when General Louis Franchet d'Espèrey, Lanrezac's successor, reacted to an incorrect report of a British retreat by making disparaging remarks about the British and their commander. Spears demanded an apology from Franchet d’Espèrey’s chief of staff, which was granted. He also suggested that Sir John French meet with Franchet d’Espèrey to resolve the misunderstanding, which took place a few days later. Spears remained with the French Fifth Army during the First Battle of the Marne, riding on horseback behind Franchet d’Espèrey when Reims was liberated on 13 September.

=== Liaison duties – French Tenth Army ===
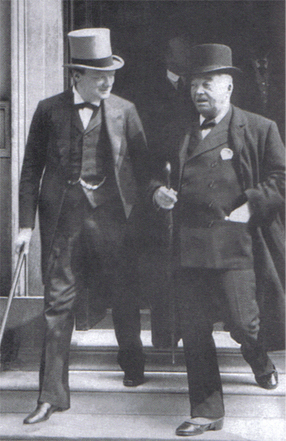
When Winston Churchill (seen here with Admiral 'Jackie' Fisher) lost his post as First Lord of the Admiralty after the failure of the Gallipoli campaign, he served on the western front. Spears escorted him during his first visit and they became friends – a relationship that would see Spears appointed WSC's special representative to de Gaulle and the Free French in the Second World War.

Spears remained with Franchet d’Espèrey after the Battle of the Marne until late September 1914, when he was assigned as liaison officer to the French 10th Army under General Louis de Maud’huy near Arras. The two developed a strong rapport, and at Maud’huy’s recommendation, Spears was made a "Chevalier de la Légion d’Honneur".

In January 1915, he was wounded for the first time and repatriated to London to recover. He was mentioned in despatches and again commended by Maud’huy, leading to his award of the Military Cross.

Again on the front in April 1915, Spears accompanied Winston Churchill, then First Lord of the Admiralty, on a tour of inspection. Often the only Englishman in a French officers’ mess, Spears experienced isolation and criticism of Britain, as many in France believed the British should be doing more.

After recovering from a second wound sustained in August 1915—one of four he would suffer during the war—Spears returned to France to find tensions between General Sir Douglas Haig, commanding the British First Army, and General Victor d’Urbal, the new commander of the French Tenth Army. Spears was tasked to improve their cooperation.

On 5 December 1915, following the failure of the Dardanelles Campaign, Churchill arrived in France seeking a military command after losing his position as First Lord of the Admiralty. The two men became friends, and Churchill suggested that if given a brigade, Spears might serve as his brigade major. However, Churchill was instead assigned a battalion, and Spears, whose liaison work was highly valued, was not permitted to join him.

Spears became acquainted with General Philippe Pétain. Before the Battle of the Somme, Spears hoped British performance would silence French criticism, but after heavy losses, some suggested the British could not withstand shell fire. This led Spears to question whether his countrymen had lost the strength and resilience of previous generations. By August 1916, caught between conflicting pressures from both sides, he feared he might suffer a breakdown.

=== General Staff – liaison between French Ministry of War and War Office in London ===
In May 1917, Spears was promoted to major and appointed General Staff Officer 1st Grade before assuming a liaison role in Paris between the French Ministry of War and the British War Office. Over the previous three years, he had established connections with influential figures in both countries. Paris at the time was characterized by political and military rivalries, with competing factions within the French military and government. Spears navigated this environment and established an independent role within the liaison structure. His role required him to report directly to the British War Office, bypassing the military attaché.

On 17 May, General Pétain, who had recently been appointed French Commander-in-Chief, informed Spears that he wanted Lieutenant-General Henry Wilson removed as the chief British liaison officer due to Wilson’s previous association with General Robert Nivelle, Pétain’s dismissed predecessor. Spears objected, recognizing the potential consequences of Wilson’s removal, but his protests were unsuccessful.

==== Reports on French mutinies and resentment ====
By 22 May 1917, Spears had learned of mutinies within the French Army and traveled to the front to assess the situation. Spears was summoned to London to brief the War Policy Cabinet Council on French morale.

Spears recorded in a 1964 BBC interview that Prime Minister David Lloyd George asked repeatedly for assurances that the French would recover. At one point Spears had said "You can shoot me if I am wrong – I know how important it is and will stake my life on it." However, Lloyd George had continued to question him, asking if he could give his word of honor as an officer and a gentleman. Spears, feeling insulted by the remark, had responded that the question itself showed a lack of understanding of both concepts.

Spears also became aware of growing French dissatisfaction with the level of British commitment to the war, which was raised in a secret parliamentary session on 7 July. Left-wing deputies argued that while France had suffered 1,300,000 casualties, British losses stood at 300,000. They also pointed out that the British sector of the front covered 138 kilometres (86 mi), whereas the French held 474 kilometres (295 mi).

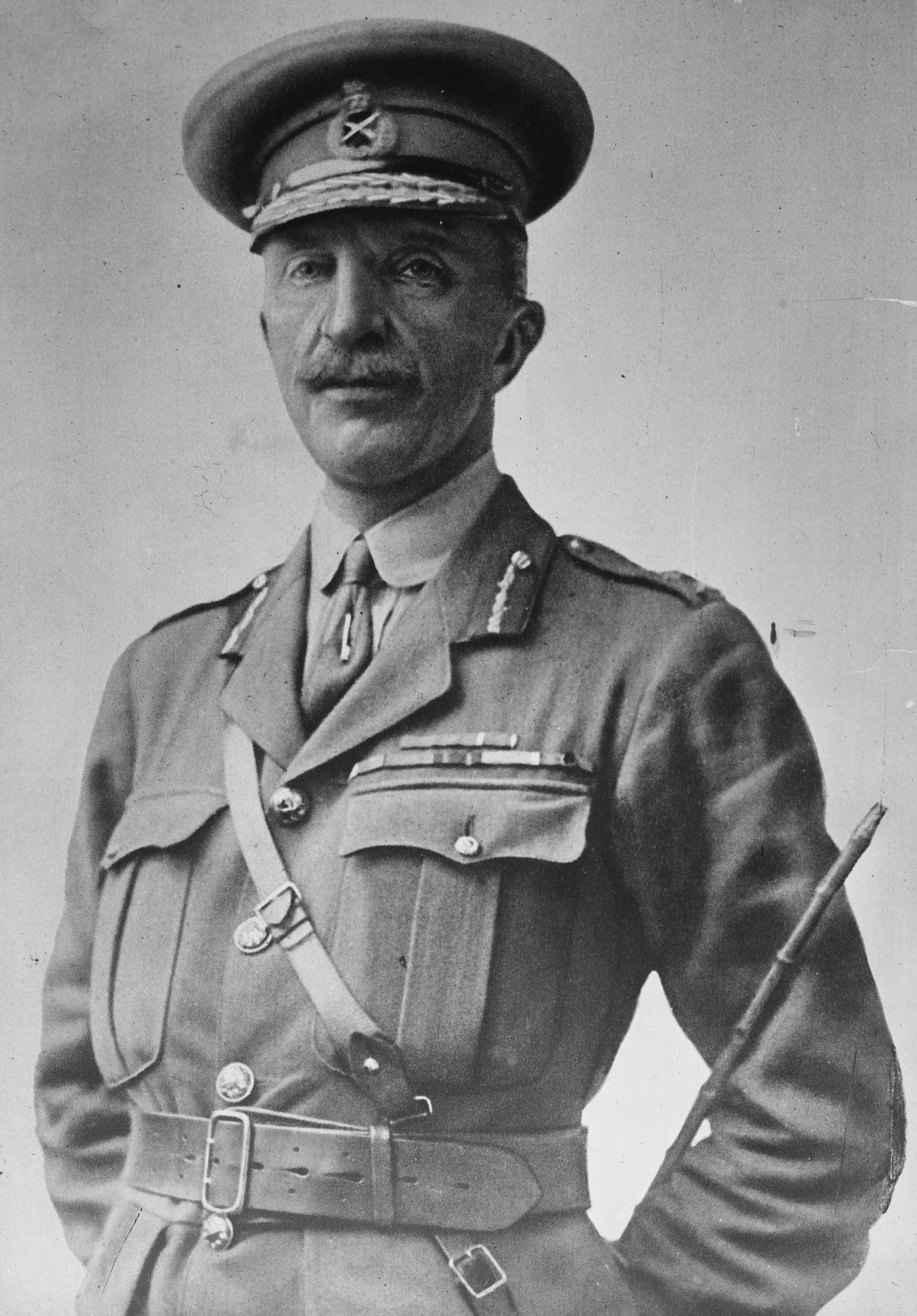
General Henry Wilson

In the wake of the Russian Revolution, efforts were made to revive the Eastern Front and detach Bulgaria from the Central Powers. In Paris, Spears worked to support these objectives and was additionally tasked with liaising with the Polish army.

==== Introduces Churchill to Clemenceau ====
In November 1917, Georges Clemenceau became Prime Minister of France and reinforced the country's resolve to continue the war. Spears reported that Clemenceau was strongly supportive of Britain and confident that France would fight to the end. Clemenceau granted Spears open access to meet with him, which he used to introduce Winston Churchill, then Minister of Munitions, to the French PM. Spears observed Clemenceau’s determination and political maneuvering, describing him as one of the most difficult and formidable figures he had encountered. He informed the Lloyd George ministry that Clemenceau was intent on asserting French dominance over the Supreme War Council and was prepared to challenge its authority.

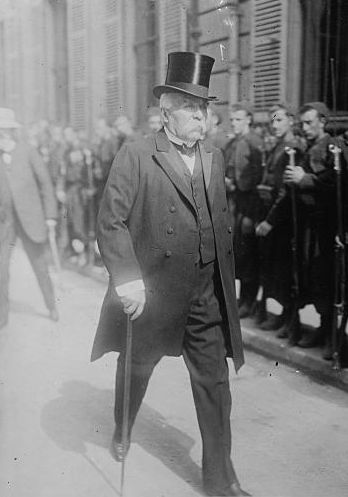
Georges Clemenceau

==== Intrigues in Paris ====
General Sir Henry Wilson described Spears as someone who "made mischief." At the first meeting of the Supreme War Council in December 1917, Spears played a key role as interpreter and intermediary. In January 1918, he was promoted to lieutenant colonel and informed that he would soon be made a brigadier general, a rank he retained after the war. However, in February, he faced uncertainty when Wilson, his adversary, replaced General Sir William Robertson as chief of the Imperial General Staff (CIGS).

Paris remained a center of political maneuvering. On 26 March 1918, General Ferdinand Foch was appointed the Supreme Allied Commander on the Western Front. Concerned about Spears’ close relationship with General Alphonse Joseph Georges, Foch sought to restrict Spears’ access to diplomatic dispatches. However, Spears maintained his position by leveraging his close ties with Prime Minister Georges Clemenceau. Meanwhile, Wilson, now Chief of the Imperial General Staff, was advised by Foch to remove Spears, prompting Spears to defend himself by arguing that his role was tied to Clemenceau rather than Foch. With support from Winston Churchill, Spears secured his position, which was later confirmed in a letter from Wilson.

In March 1918, the German spring offensive pushed Allied forces back and Paris came under artillery bombardment. This led to increased tensions between British and French commanders. Field Marshal Sir Douglas Haig, commander-in-chief of the British Expeditionary Force (BEF), expressed frustration over the perceived lack of French support, while the French questioned why the British struggled to hold their positions. Spears faced suspicion from both sides. The antisemitic French ambassador in London believed Spears had ingratiated himself with French officials, including former War Minister Paul Painlevé, and accused him of passing secrets to the British. At the same time, Spears alleged that Professor Alfred Mantoux was leaking information to the French socialist Albert Thomas. Wilson dismissed the claim, stating that Spears was jealous of Mantoux, whom he saw as a rival interpreter. By late May, as German forces reached the Marne, even Clemenceau distanced himself from Spears. According to Edward Stanley, the newly appointed British Ambassador to France, this was because Spears provided London with information Clemenceau preferred to withhold.

By September 1918, the German retreat had begun. While Foch offered praise for Britain’s efforts, the French press remained indifferent. After the Armistice with Germany on 11 November, tensions persisted. In his victory speech to the Chamber of Deputies, Clemenceau did not mention Britain, a decision Spears viewed as deliberate.

== Romance and marriage ==
=== Jessie Gordon ===
In 1908, while serving as a young cavalry officer, Spears suffered a concussion after being knocked unconscious during a polo match. He was treated at a nursing home in London, where he developed a relationship with Jessie Gordon, one of the two women running the facility. The affair lasted several years and was a source of emotional turmoil for him.

=== Mary Borden ===
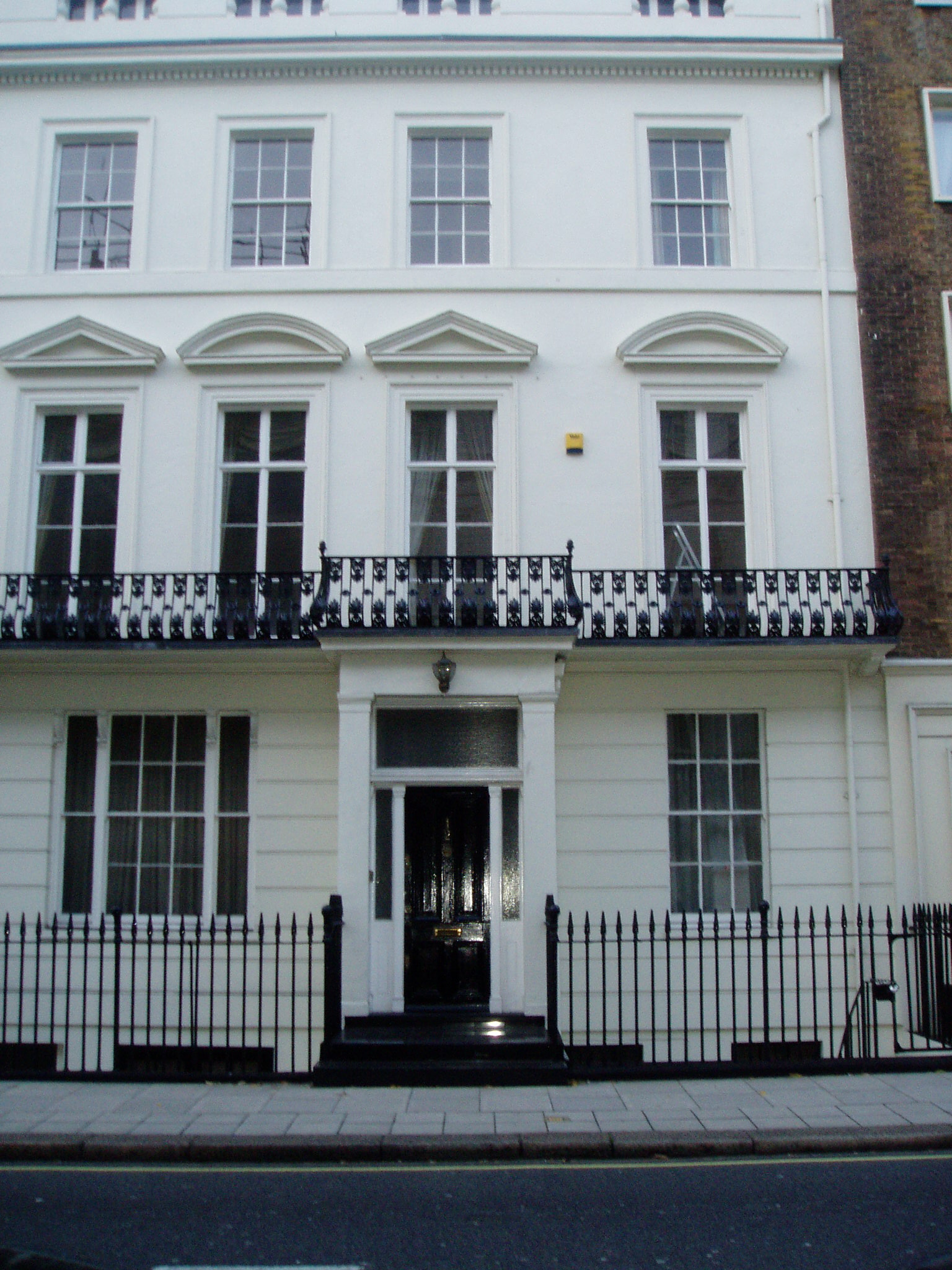
12 Strathearn Place – the London home of Louis and May before, during and after the Second World War. The house was damaged on 15 October 1940, when a bomb fell next door. The rebuilt house can just be seen.

In October 1916, near the Western Front, Spears met Mary Borden, an American novelist and wealthy heiress. The two developed a mutual attraction, and by the spring of 1917, they had become lovers. Following her divorce in January 1918, they were married at the British consulate in Paris three months later.

Their only child, Michael, was born in 1921. He suffered from osteomyelitis as a teenager and struggled with poor health throughout his life. After winning a scholarship to the University of Oxford, he worked at the Foreign Office.He later suffered from depression and was unable to continue working. He died at the age of 47.

The financial security Spears and Borden had through her inheritance ended when she lost her wealth in the Wall Street crash of 1929.

During the Second World War, Borden established the Hadfield-Spears Ambulance Unit in 1940.

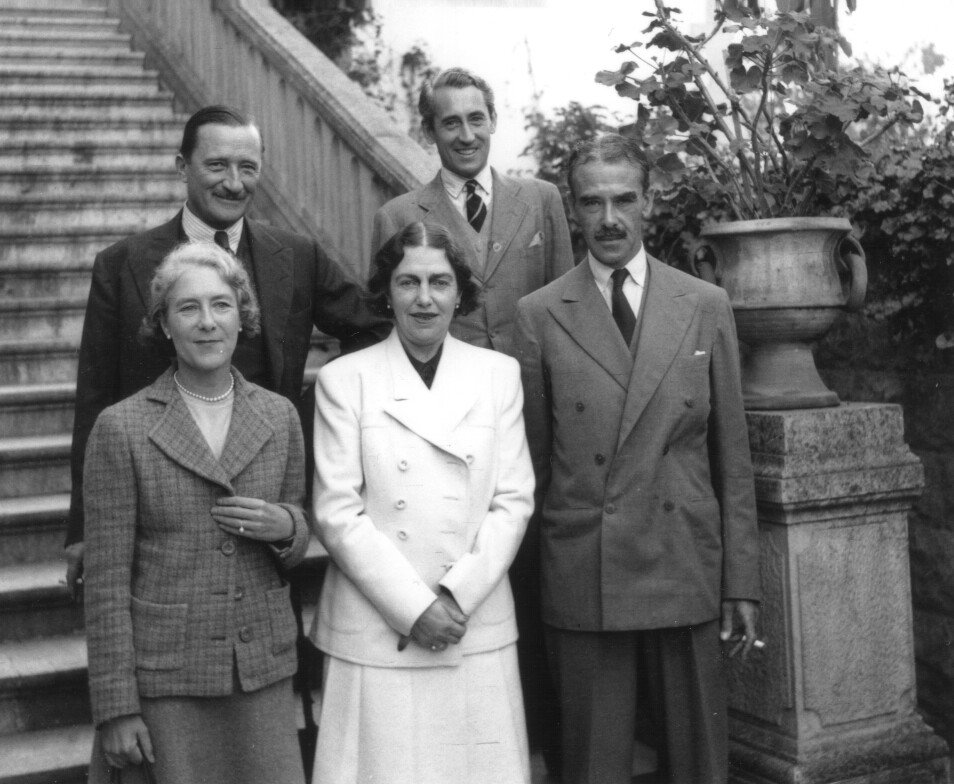
Lady Spears (centre) with Sir Edward Spears (left) in December 1942 in Lebanon on the steps of their residence – that of the First British Minister to the Levant. To the right of Sir Edward stands Henry Hopkinson, private secretary to the Permanent Under-Secretary of State for Foreign Affairs, Sir Alexander Cadogan; Richard Casey is to the right of Lady Spears, with Mrs Ethel (Maie) Casey to her left.

In June 1945, despite Charles de Gaulle barring British participation in a Paris victory parade, Borden’s ambulance unit joined, displaying the French and British flags. Hearing wounded soldiers cheer Spears, de Gaulle ordered the unit’s dissolution and British members’ repatriation. Borden protested to de Gaulle, who denied disbanding the unit over the British flag, citing broader cuts. On 5 July, she voiced disappointment, highlighting its ties to the 1st Free French Division.

Mary Borden died on 2 December 1968.

=== Nancy Maurice ===
Spears resigned his commission in June 1919, concluding his tenure as Head of the Military Mission in Paris. In October of the same year, Sir Frederick Maurice visited the city with his daughter, Nancy. Nancy Maurice, who had received a formal education and training as a secretary, agreed to work for Spears in a temporary capacity. She later remained in the position for 42 years and an affair developed. He was promoted to lieutenant general on 30 June 1920.

In the spring of 1942, Nancy accompanied Spears to the Levant as his secretary following his sick leave in Britain. After World War II, she assisted him in his role as chairman of the Ashanti Goldfields Corporation in the Gold Coast. Following the death of Mary Borden in 1968, he and Nancy married on 4 December 1969 at St Paul’s Church, Knightsbridge. She became the second Lady Spears and died in 1975.

== Inter-war years ==
=== Business and political links with Czechoslovakia ===
In 1921, Spears entered into a business partnership with a Finnish associate with the goal of establishing trade connections in the newly founded First Czechoslovak Republic. During a visit to Prague, he met Prime Minister Eduard Beneš and Jan Masaryk, the son of President Tomáš Masaryk, and also came into contact with officials from the Czech Finance Ministry.

Spears' business activities in Prague expanded in 1934 when he became chairman of the British branch of the Bata shoe company, which was part of the larger international Bata organization. He later served as a director of J. Fisher, a merchant company with trade ties to Czechoslovakia, and as a director of a Czech steelworks. His business dealings were met with disapproval from some members of the Conservative Party, particularly those who held anti-Semitic views. Duff Cooper remarked that Spears was "the most unpopular man in the House" and advised against trusting him.

Spears' visits to Czechoslovakia and his connections with its political figures reinforced his efforts to promote support for the republic in both London and Paris. He strongly opposed the Munich Agreement of 1938. His opposition to the agreement placed him at odds with members of the Conservative Party who largely supported it. His advocacy for Czechoslovakia also aligned with his business interests, as the country's dissolution would have affected his financial holdings and an annual income of approximately £2,000.

=== Member of Parliament ===
Spears served as a Member of Parliament (MP) twice, representing Loughborough from 1922 to 1924 and Carlisle from 1931 to 1945. His strong support for France in parliamentary debates led to him being dubbed "the Member for Paris".

==== Loughborough ====
In December 1921, Spears was selected as the National Liberal Party's parliamentary candidate for Loughborough. He was elected unopposed in 1922 after the Labour Party candidate failed to submit nomination papers on time, and the Conservatives had agreed not to put up a candidate to oppose him.

During the campaign for the Dundee constituency, Spears and Borden campaigned on behalf of Winston Churchill, who was hospitalized at the time, but Churchill was unsuccessful in the election. As a gesture of friendship, Spears offered to vacate his seat at Loughborough, but Churchill declined the offer.

Spears delivered his maiden speech in February 1923, in which he criticized both the Foreign Office and the British Embassy in Paris. Later that month, he spoke in the House of Commons against the French occupation of the Ruhr. He retained his seat as a National Liberal in the 1923 general election but was defeated in 1924, finishing third behind the Conservative and Labour candidates.

He made two further unsuccessful attempts to return to Parliament: at a by-election in Bosworth in 1927 and in Carlisle during the 1929 general election.

==== Carlisle ====
At the General Election in October 1931, Spears stood as a National Conservative candidate and was elected Member of Parliament for Carlisle. In June 1935, Ramsay MacDonald resigned as Prime Minister of the National Government to be succeeded by the Conservative Stanley Baldwin. At the general election in November 1935, Spears again stood as a National Conservative candidate at Carlisle and was returned with a reduced majority. At his house in 1934, there was held the first meeting of a cross-party group which would later become the European Study Group. Its members included Robert Boothby, Josiah Wedgwood, and Clement Attlee. Spears became its chairman in 1936; it would become a focus for those MPs who were suspicious of the European policies of Neville Chamberlain's National Government.

=== First World War books ===
Liaison 1914; A Narrative of the Great Retreat, was published in September 1930 with a foreword by Winston Churchill. This personal account of his experiences as a liaison officer from July to September 1914 was well received. The preface states: 'The object of this book is to contribute something to the true story of the war, and to vindicate the role of the British Expeditionary Force in 1914.' As far as the French were concerned, Charles Lanrezac came in for heavy criticism but there was praise for Marshals Franchet d'Esperey and Joseph Joffre. On the British side, Spears wrote favourably of General Macdonough, who, as a colonel, had recruited him for military intelligence in 1909, and of Field Marshal Sir John French. Liaison 1914 describes vividly the horrors of war – the shoeless refugees, the loss of comrades and the devastated landscape. Two years later, a French translation was also successful, the only dissent coming from the son of General Lanrezac, who denied Spears' account of his father's rudeness to Sir John French. The French politician Paul Reynaud, who would later serve briefly as Prime Minister of France from 21 March to 16 June 1940, took the book as an illustration of how France must not allow herself to become separated from Britain. Liaison 1914 was published again in the US in May 1931 and received high praise.

In 1939 Spears published Prelude to Victory, an account of the early months of 1917, containing a famous account of the Calais Conference in which Lloyd George had attempted to place the British forces under the command of General Nivelle, and culminating in the Battle of Arras. With war looming once again, Spears wrote that given time constraints he had chosen to concentrate on the period with the greatest lessons for Anglo-French relations. The book also contains a foreword by Winston Churchill, stating that Spears had not, in his view, been entirely fair to Lloyd George's wish to see Britain abstain from major offensives until the Americans were present in force.

=== Opposes appeasement ===
Spears became a member of the so-called 'Eden Group' of anti-appeasement backbench MPs. This group, known disparagingly by the Conservative whips as 'The Glamour Boys', formed around Anthony Eden when he had resigned as Foreign Secretary in February 1938 in protest at the opening of negotiations with Italy by the Prime Minister, Neville Chamberlain. Given his long-standing friendship with Winston Churchill, it was not surprising that Spears also joined the latter's group of anti-appeasers, known as 'The Old Guard'. Both groups called for rearmament in the face of Nazi threats.

=== Eve of war ===
In August 1939, with war looming, Spears accompanied Winston Churchill to eastern France on a visit to the Maginot Line. In Strasbourg, he had the idea of floating mines linked together by cables down the Rhine – an action to be carried out on the declaration of war to damage bridges. Initially sceptical about the plan, Churchill would later approve it under the code name of Operation Royal Marine, but claim that it had been his own idea.

== Second World War ==
=== Phoney War ===
During the Phoney War, Spears favoured a hawkish policy; lamenting that Britain and France were not doing 'anything more warlike than dropping leaflets'. He urged active support for the Poles and wanted Germany to be bombed; he was set to speak in the House criticizing the failure to aid Poland as a violation of the Anglo-Polish Agreement but was dissuaded by Secretary of State for Air Kingsley Wood – much to his later regret.

As Chairman of the Anglo-French Committee of the House of Commons, he fostered links with his friends across the Channel, and in October 1939 led a delegation of MPs on a visit to the Chamber of Deputies of France when they were taken to the Maginot Line.

Four months later, Spears was sent to France to check on Operation Royal Marine for Winston Churchill, returning with him in April. Thousands of mines were to be released into the Rhine by the Royal Navy to destroy bridges and disrupt river traffic. The operation was vetoed by the French for fear of reprisals, but a postponement was finally agreed.

=== Battle of France ===
On 10 May 1940, the Wehrmacht began the Battle of France by invading Belgium, the Netherlands, and Luxembourg. The same day, King George VI appointed Churchill prime minister following the resignation of Chamberlain. The Churchill war ministry was a unity coalition government.

Also on 10 May 1940, Operation Royal Marine was launched, producing the results that Spears had prophesied. By then the German blitzkrieg was underway and the success, as Churchill noted, was lost in the 'deluge of disaster' that was the fall of France.

=== Churchill's Personal Representative to the French Prime Minister ===
==== Spears leaves for Paris ====
On 22 May 1940 (four days before the Battle of Dunkirk beegan), Spears was summoned to 10 Downing Street. With British and French forces retreating before the German Blitzkrieg, and confused and contradictory reports arriving from across the Channel, Churchill had decided to send Spears as his personal representative to Paul Reynaud, the Prime Minister of France, who was also acting as Minister of Defence since 18 May 1940. Three days later, having managed to find the various pieces of his uniform which he had not worn since leaving the army in 1919, he left by plane for Paris holding the rank of major general.

==== Doubts about Pétain ====
During the chaos and confusion of the allied retreat, Spears continued to meet senior French political and military figures. He put forward the view that tanks could be halted by blowing up buildings; he also urged that prefects should not leave their departments without first ensuring that all petrol had been destroyed. On 26 May, he met Marshal Philippe Pétain; the old man reminisced about their time together during the First World War and 'treated him like a son'. Yet it seemed that the Marshal 'in his great age, epitomised the paralysis of the French people'. He became aware of the difficulties of re-creating a liaison organisation; in 1917 his mission had been established over several years. Starting again from scratch, the task seemed 'as impossible as to recall the dead'.

==== Weygand's pessimism and Belgian capitulation ====
During a visit to London on Sunday 26 May, the French Prime Minister Paul Reynaud had reported to Churchill the view of the new Commander-in-Chief General Maxime Weygand that the struggle had become hopeless. On 27 May, Churchill demanded an immediate report from Spears, who was told to resist such defeatism. Reynaud referred to 'mortal danger' with reference to a possible attack by Fascist Italy, which had not yet entered the war; Spears' view was that the French army in the Alps was strong and that the only danger from the Italians would be if they interfered with the transport of troops from French North Africa. Yet perversely, Italian intervention might be good for allied morale: 'our combined fleets would whip them around the Mediterranean'. Reynaud and Spears argued, the former calling for more British air support, the latter, exasperated, asking, "Why don't you import Finns and Spaniards to show the people how to resist an invader?" He went on to compare unfavourably the spirit of Paris in 1940 with that which he had known in 1914. That evening, Spears and the British Ambassador were summoned to the Ministry of War – news of the sudden Belgian surrender had infuriated Reynaud, Pétain and Weygand; Spears was briefly encouraged, but then irritated by Weygand's criticism of Lord Gort, the commander of the British Expeditionary Force. At the end of the day, Spears noted that he 'sensed a break in the relationship between the two nations; they were 'no longer one'.

==== Invasion of Britain could be repulsed ====
On 28 May, Reynaud asked the British Ambassador, Sir Ronald Hugh Campbell and Spears for their view regarding a direct appeal for help to the United States. Sir Ronald declined to comment, but Spears said it had no chance of success; America would not declare war overnight and, in any case, it was not within the President's power. The prospect of an attempted German invasion across the Channel was of some comfort to Reynaud for it would give the French breathing space. Far from feeling intimidated, Spears welcomed the prospect: 'it did not even occur to me that we could not deal successfully with an attempted invasion. It would be wonderful indeed if the Nazi forces ventured on our own element, the sea'. During a discussion with Georges Mandel (Interior Minister, and one of the few hawks in the French Cabinet), he was told that Albert Lebrun, the President of the Republic was weeping with despair. Mandel reported the criticism of Weygand and General Joseph Vuillemin (Commander of the French Armée de l'Air) over insufficient British air support; Vuillemin doubted that his own air force could withstand the losses it was sustaining.

==== Discussions about Dunkirk, Narvik and Italy at Supreme War Council in Paris ====
On 31 May 1940, Churchill flew to Paris with Clement Attlee and Generals John Dill (Chief of the Imperial General Staff) and "Pug" Ismay for a meeting of the Anglo French Supreme War Council to discuss the deteriorating military situation with a French delegation consisting of Reynaud, Pétain and Weygand. Three main points were considered: Narvik, the Dunkirk evacuation and the prospect of an Italian invasion of France. Spears did not take part in the discussions but was present 'taking voluminous notes'. It was agreed that British and French forces at Narvik be evacuated without delay – France urgently needed the manpower. Spears was impressed with the way that Churchill dominated the meeting. Dunkirk was the main topic, the French pointing out that 'out of 200,000 British 150,000 had been evacuated, whereas out of 200,000 Frenchmen only 15,000 had been taken off'. Churchill promised that now British and French soldiers would leave together 'bras dessus, bras dessous' – arm in arm. Italian entry into the war seemed imminent, with Churchill urging the bombing of the industrial north by British aircraft based in southern France while at the same time trying to gauge whether the French feared retaliation. Spears guessed that he was trying to assess the French will to fight. With the agenda completed, Churchill spoke passionately about the need for the two countries to fight on, or 'they would be reduced to the status of slaves for ever'. Spears was moved 'by the emotion that surged from Winston Churchill in great torrents'.

During discussions after the meeting, a group formed around Churchill, Pétain and Spears. One of the French officials mentioned the possibility of France seeking a separate peace. Speaking to Pétain, Spears pointed out that such an event would provoke a blockade of France by Britain and the bombardment of all French ports in German hands. Churchill declared that Britain would fight on whatever happened.

==== Returns to London with message for Churchill ====
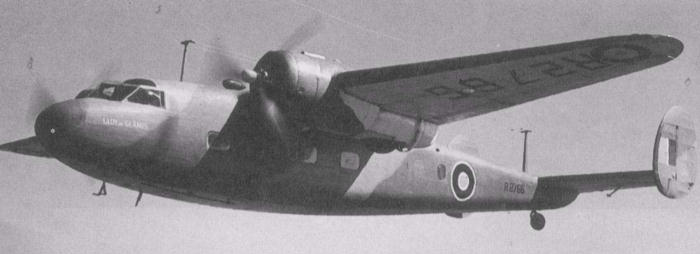
The de Havilland Flamingo transport aircraft. Churchill's personal Flamingo, in which he flew to and from France during the crisis of May and June 1940, was operated by No. XXIV Squadron RAF.

On 7 June, with the Wehrmacht advancing on Paris, Spears flew to London in Churchill's personal aircraft bearing a personal message from Reynaud to the British Prime Minister. The French were requesting British divisions, and fighter squadrons to be based in France. In reply, Spears had inquired how many French troops were being transferred from North Africa. In London, he was asked whether the French would, as Clémenceau had said, "Fight outside Paris, inside Paris, behind Paris." His view was that they would not permit the destruction of that beautiful city, but this was contradicted on 11 June by a French government spokesman who told the Daily Telegraph that Paris would never be declared an open city. (The following day General Weygand issued orders declaring that Paris was not to be defended.)

==== Accompanies Churchill to conference at Briare ====
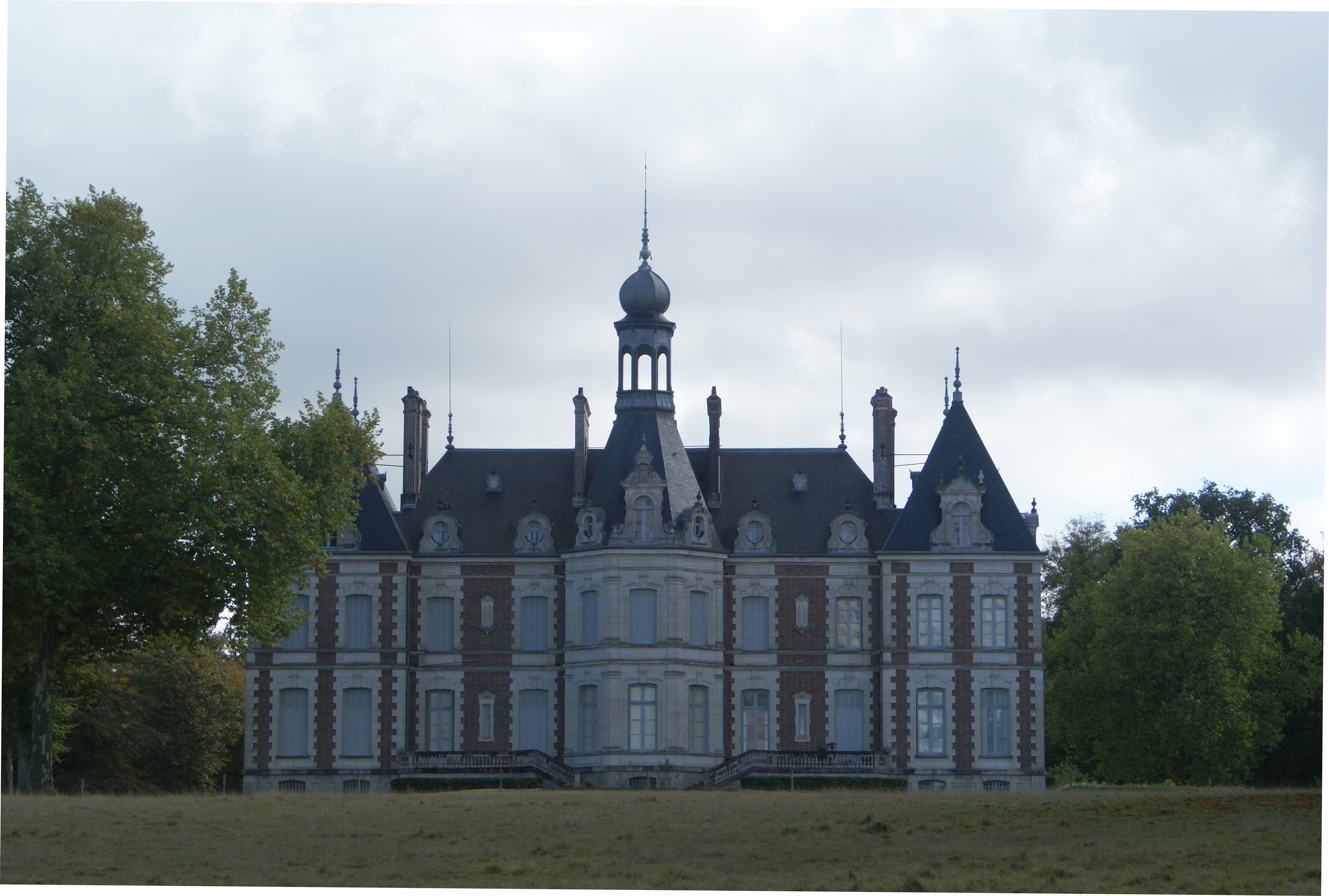
Chateau du Muguet at Briare, HQ of General Weygand and venue of the conference on 11 June 1940

On 11 June, Spears returned to France with Churchill, Eden, Generals Dill and Ismay and other staff officers. A meeting of the Anglo French Supreme War Council had been arranged with Reynaud, who had been forced to leave Paris, at Briare near Orleans, which was now the HQ of General Weygand. Also present was General Charles de Gaulle; Spears had not met him before and was impressed with his bearing. As wrangling continued over the level of support from Britain, Spears suddenly became aware that 'the battle of France was over and that no one believed in miracles'. The next day Weygand's catastrophic account of the military situation reinforced his pessimism. Despite assurances from Admiral François Darlan, the British were worried that the powerful French fleet might fall into German hands. With the conference drawing to a close, it dawned on Spears that the two countries were 'within sight of a cross-roads at which the destinies of the two nations might divide'.

==== Spears argues with Pétain – departure for Tours ====
He remained at Briare after Churchill had left for London on 12 June; later that day he argued with Marshal Pétain, who maintained that an armistice with Germany was now inevitable, complaining that the British had left France to fight alone. Spears referred to Churchill's words of defiance at the meeting, feeling that some of the French might remain in the struggle if they could be made to believe that Britain would fight on. The Marshal replied, "You cannot beat Hitler with words." He began to feel estrangement from Pétain, whose attitude, for the first time in their relationship, savoured of hostility. His concern was now to link up with the Ambassador, Sir Ronald Hugh Campbell, and he set out by car for Tours. On the way they drove through crowds of refugees, many of whom had become stranded when their cars ran out of fuel. At the Chateau de Chissey high above the River Cher, he found Reynaud and his ministers struggling to govern France, but with insufficient telephone lines and in makeshift accommodation. Again he met de Gaulle, 'whose courage was keen and clear, born of love of, and inspired by, his country'. Later in the day, he heard to his astonishment that Reynaud had left for Tours because Churchill was flying over for another meeting. In the confusion, neither Spears nor Sir Ronald had been informed. Fearful that he might not arrive in time, he set off at once along roads choked with refugees.

==== Last-ditch talks at Tours ====
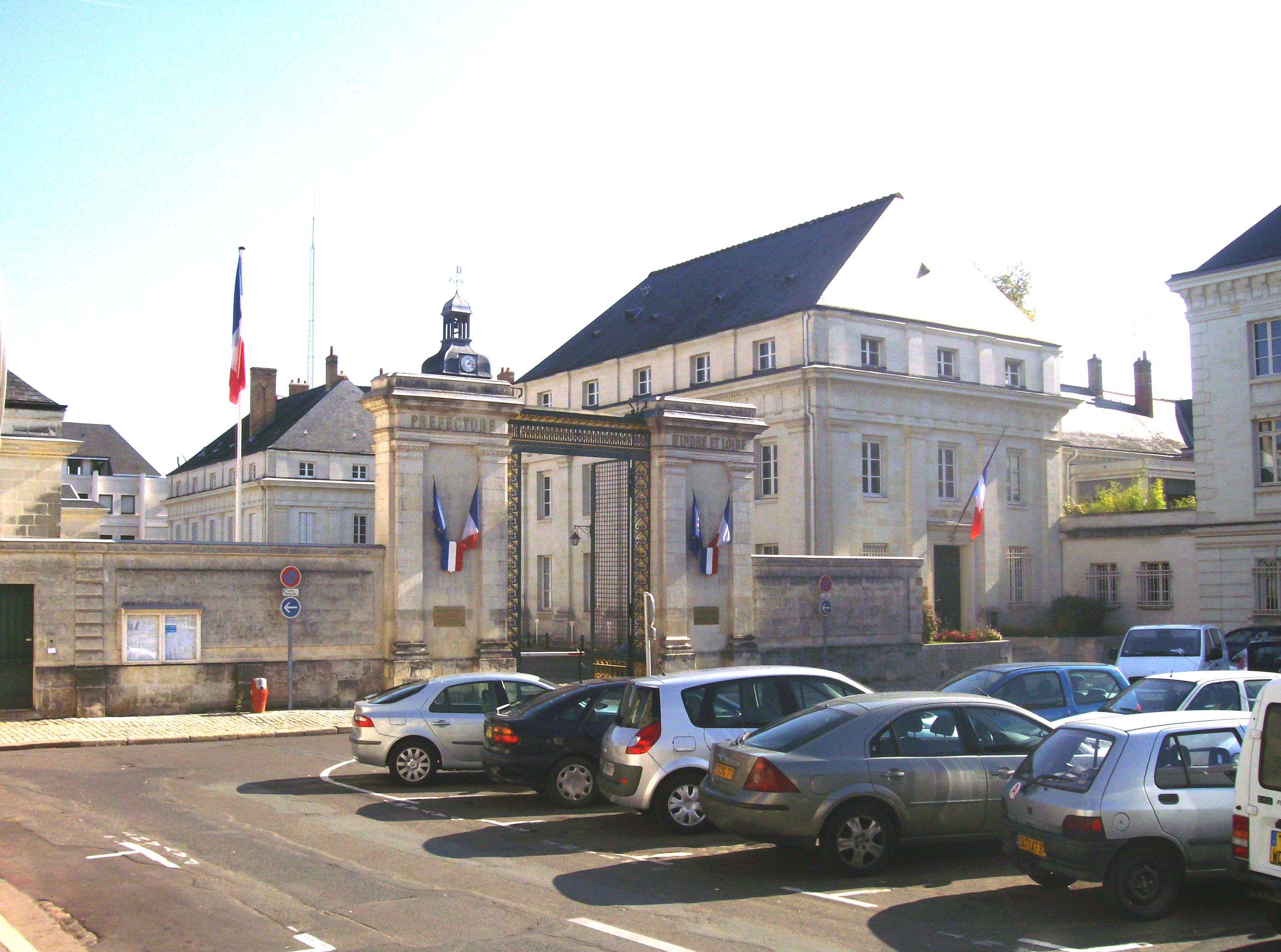
The Préfecture at Tours – scene of crisis talks.

What would prove to be the final meeting of the Anglo French Supreme War Council took place at the Préfecture in Tours on 13 June. When Spears arrived, the British delegation – Churchill, Lord Halifax, Lord Beaverbrook, Sir Alexander Cadogan and General 'Pug' Ismay – were already there. The French Prime Minister, Paul Reynaud, was accompanied by Paul Baudoin, a member of the War Committee. Spears found the atmosphere quite different from that at Briare, where Churchill had expressed good will, sympathy and sorrow; now it was like a business meeting, with the British keenly appraising the situation from its own point of view. Reynaud declared that unless immediate help was assured by the US, the French government would have to give up the struggle. He acknowledged that the two countries had agreed never to conclude a separate peace – but France was physically incapable of carrying on. The news was received by the British with shock and horror; Spears' feelings were expressed by the exclamation marks which he scrawled in his notes. Spears noted Churchill's determination as he said, "We must fight, we will fight, and that is why we must ask our friends to fight on." Prime Minister Reynaud acknowledged that Britain would continue the war, affirming that France would also continue the struggle from North Africa, if necessary – but only if there were a chance of success. That success could come only if America were prepared to join the fray. The French leader called for British understanding, asking again for France to be released from her obligation not to conclude a separate peace now that she could do no more. Spears passed a note to Churchill proposing an adjournment – a suggestion that was taken up.

The British walked around the sodden garden of the prefecture, Spears reporting that Reynaud's mood had changed since that morning, when he had spoken of his resistance to the 'armisticers'. He told Churchill that he was certain that de Gaulle was staunch, but that General Weygand looked upon anyone who wished to fight as an enemy. Beaverbrook urged Churchill to repeat what he had already said – namely that U.S. President Franklin D. Roosevelt be telegraphed and American help sought. When the proceedings were resumed, it was agreed that both countries would send identical telegrams. It was on this note that the conference ended.

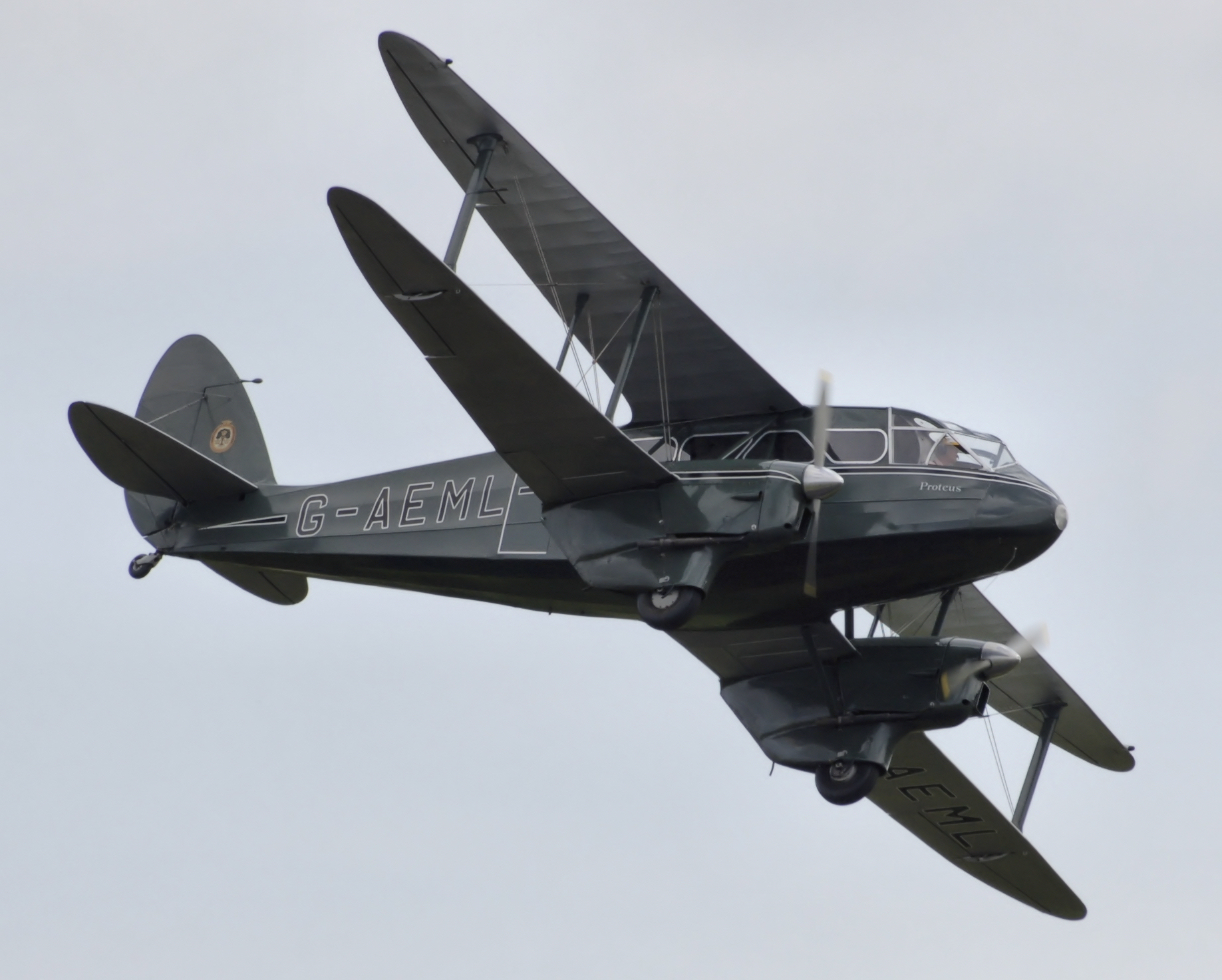
Spears and de Gaulle flew from Bordeaux to England via Jersey in a Dragon Rapide. There was some dispute after the war as to whether the aircraft had been at the command of Spears or of de Gaulle; the matter has never been satisfactorily resolved.

==== Linguistic misunderstanding ====
After the meeting, de Gaulle told Spears that Paul Baudoin had been telling journalists that Churchill had said that "he would understand if France concluded a separate armistice" ... "que l'Angleterre comprendrait si la France faisait un armistice et une paix séparée". Spears realised there had been a linguistic misunderstanding. When Reynaud spoke (in French) about a separate armistice, Churchill had said, "Je comprends" (I understand) in the sense of 'I understand what you say', not in the sense of 'I agree'. Just as Churchill was about to take off for Britain, Spears obtained his assurance that he had never given consent to a separate armistice. But the damage had been done and, on 23 June, the words would be quoted by Admiral François Darlan, who signalled all French warships saying that the British Prime Minister had declared that 'he understood' the necessity for France to bring the struggle to an end'.

==== Churchill fails to address French cabinet ====
The day ended in confusion – Churchill flew back to London without speaking to the French cabinet, as had been promised by Reynaud. The ministers were dismayed and angry; Spears was depressed, realising that 'an opportunity that might not recur had been missed'. He was at a loss to understand why a meeting had not taken place – had Reynaud simply forgotten? Did Reynaud wish to explain the situation to the ministers himself? In any event, his ministers were disillusioned and felt abandoned. Spears believed that this event played its part in swaying the majority of the cabinet towards surrender. He was sure that 'by the night of 13 June, the possibility of France remaining in the war had almost disappeared'. The only hope rested on the decision of President Roosevelt – would America now join the war?

==== End game at Bordeaux – London offers a Franco-British Union ====
On 14 June, Spears left Tours to look for Reynaud and his government, which had moved to Bordeaux. On the way, he was conscious that the attitude of people to the sight of a British uniform had changed – they were morose if not hostile. When he reached Bordeaux, he learnt that Paris had fallen that morning. Spears found Reynaud – he had not received a satisfactory reply from Roosevelt but was still clinging to the hope. Spears found him worn out, forlorn and undecided. The British consulate was besieged with crowds of would-be refugees seeking passage out of France.

==== Spears rails against defeatism ====
The next day he clashed with Camille Chautemps, vice-president of the cabinet, upbraiding him for his defeatism and praising the spirit of the French soldiers that he had known during the First World War. He later spoke to Roland de Margerie, Reynaud's Chef de cabinet and raised the matter of several hundred German pilots who were prisoners of the French, asking that they be handed over to the British. However, there was much confusion and telephone communications were difficult even within the city of Bordeaux itself. Spears now had misgivings about Reynaud's determination to stay in the war, if necessary from French North Africa. He was outraged that despite the critical situation, the French Commander in Chief in North Africa was opposed to receiving troops from France. There was insufficient accommodation, no spare weapons, there was a shortage of doctors; moreover the climate was rather warm for young Frenchmen at this season! In Spears' view this was monstrous; why did Reynaud not dismiss the obstructionist general? He asked why the idea of forming a redoubt in Brittany had been dropped and why Reynaud did not dismiss General Weygand for his defeatism. Margerie replied that the people had faith in Weygand and that he also had the support of Pétain. Continuing in the same vein, Spears poured cold water on the notion that America might join the war. Spears and the ambassador sent a telegram to London explaining that everything now hung on an assurance from the US, adding that they would to their utmost to obtain the scuttling of the French fleet. Their final words were, "We have little confidence in anything now." They heard that Marshal Pétain would resign if American help was not forthcoming; Spears concluded that Reynaud would not continue in the face of combined opposition from the Marshal and Weygand. He longed for the presence of Churchill, which would have been 'worth more than millions in gold could buy'.

Spears and the Ambassador were called following a meeting of the cabinet. The linguistic confusion from Tours returned to haunt them as Reynaud began, "As Mr Churchill stated at Tours he would agree that France should sue for an armistice...." Spears stopped writing and objected, "I cannot take that down for it is untrue." The minutes of the Tours meeting were produced and Spears was vindicated. Reynaud wrote a message to Churchill, stating that France sought leave of Britain to inquire about armistice terms; if Britain declined, he would resign. At this point an aide handed him Roosevelt's refusal to declare war – Reynaud was in despair. He did, however, guarantee that any successor would not surrender the fleet in an armistice. Spears felt sympathy for the French army, but contempt for Weygand, 'a hysterical, egocentric old man'.

==== British refusal to allow France to seek a separate peace ====
By 16 June, Spears and Sir Ronald Campbell were sure that once the French had asked for an armistice they would never fight again. With regard to the French Empire and the fleet, there was a possibility that if German armistice terms were too harsh, the Empire might rebel against them, even if metropolitan France succumbed. It did not occur to them that Hitler would split France into two zones thus dividing it against itself. Early the same morning, Reynaud, nervously exhausted and depressed, asked again for France to be relieved of its undertaking not to make a separate peace. The British took a hard line, pointing out that the solemn undertaking had been drawn up to meet the existing contingency; in any case, France [with its overseas possessions and fleet] was still in a position to carry on. While these top-level discussions were being held, Hélène de Portes, Reynaud's mistress repeatedly entered the room, much to the irritation of Spears and the Ambassador. Spears felt that her pernicious influence had done Reynaud great harm.

==== British acceptance of armistice dependent on fate of French fleet ====
Shortly before lunch a telegram arrived from London agreeing that France could seek armistice terms provided that the French fleet was sailed forthwith for British harbours pending negotiations. Spears and the Ambassador felt this would be taken as an insult by the French Navy and an indication of distrust. Reynaud received the news with derision – if Britain wanted France to continue the war from North Africa, how could they ask her fleet to go to British harbours? He had spoken by telephone with Churchill and asked Spears to arrange a meeting with the British Prime Minister, at sea somewhere off Brittany. The meeting, however, never took place as he preferred to go in a French warship and this never materialised. As the day wore on, Spears became more aware of defeatism – but the hard-liners tended to be socialists. His British uniform struck a false note and people avoided him.

==== French reject Franco-British Union ====
On the afternoon of 16 June, Spears and the Ambassador met Reynaud to convey a message from London – it would be in the interest of both countries for the French fleet to be moved to British ports; it was assumed that every effort would be made to transfer the air force to North Africa or to Britain; Polish, Belgian and Czech troops in France should be sent to North Africa. While they were arguing with increasing acrimony about the fleet, a call came through from de Gaulle, who was in London. The British proposition was nothing less than a Declaration of Union – 'France and Great Britain shall no longer be two nations, but one Franco-British Union. Every citizen of France will enjoy immediate citizenship of Great Britain; every British subject will become a citizen of France.' Spears became 'transfixed with amazement'; Reynaud was exulted. When the news got out, hard-liners such as Georges Mandel were pleased and relieved. The proposal would be put before the French cabinet. Spears was optimistic that it would be accepted for how could it be that of the countries fighting Germany, France should be the only one to give up the struggle, when she possessed an Empire second only to our own and a fleet whole and entire, the strongest after ours in Europe'. Yet he joked that the only common denominator of an Anglo-French Parliament would be 'an abysmal ignorance of each other's language'!

While the cabinet meeting was taking place, Spears and the Ambassador heard that Churchill, Clement Attlee, Sir Archibald Sinclair, the three Chiefs of Staff and others would arrive off Brittany in a warship the next day at noon for talks with the French. However, the French cabinet rejected the offer of union; Reynaud would be resigning. One minister had commented that the proposal would make France into a British Dominion. Spears, on the other hand, felt the rejection 'was like stabbing a friend bent over you in grief and affection'. Churchill and his delegation were already in the train at Waterloo station, when news of the rejection came through. He returned to Downing Street 'with a heavy heart'.

==== De Gaulle fears arrest ====
In Bordeaux, Spears and Sir Ronald Campbell went to see Reynaud at his dimly-lit offices. According to Spears, he was approached in the darkness by de Gaulle, who said that Weygand intended to arrest him. Reynaud told the British that Pétain would be forming a government. Spears noted that it would consist entirely of defeatists and that the French Prime Minister had 'the air of a man relieved of a great burden'. Incredibly Reynaud asked when Churchill would be arriving off Brittany in the morning. Spears was short with him: "Tomorrow there will be a new government and you will no longer speak for anyone." However, he later came to realise that Reynaud had never double-crossed his ally, but had done his best to hold the alliance while fighting against men stronger than he was. His fault lay in his inability to pick good men. After the meeting, Spears found de Gaulle and decided to help him escape to Britain. He telephoned Churchill and got his somewhat reluctant agreement to bring over both de Gaulle and Georges Mandel. The latter, however, declined to come, opting instead to go to North Africa. It was arranged that de Gaulle would come to Spears' hotel at 7 o'clock in the morning of the following day.

==== Spears leaves for Britain with de Gaulle ====
On 17 June, de Gaulle and his ADC, Lieutenant Geoffroy de Courcel, went with Spears to the airfield on the pretext of seeing him off. After a delay while de Gaulle's baggage was secured, the De Havilland Flamingo took off for Britain. Winston Churchill wrote that Spears personally rescued de Gaulle from France just before the German conquest, literally pulling the Frenchman into his plane as it was taking off from Bordeaux for Britain. When they had reached Britain, de Gaulle gave Spears a signed photograph with the inscription, "To General Spears, witness, ally, friend."

=== Spears heads British government's mission to de Gaulle ===
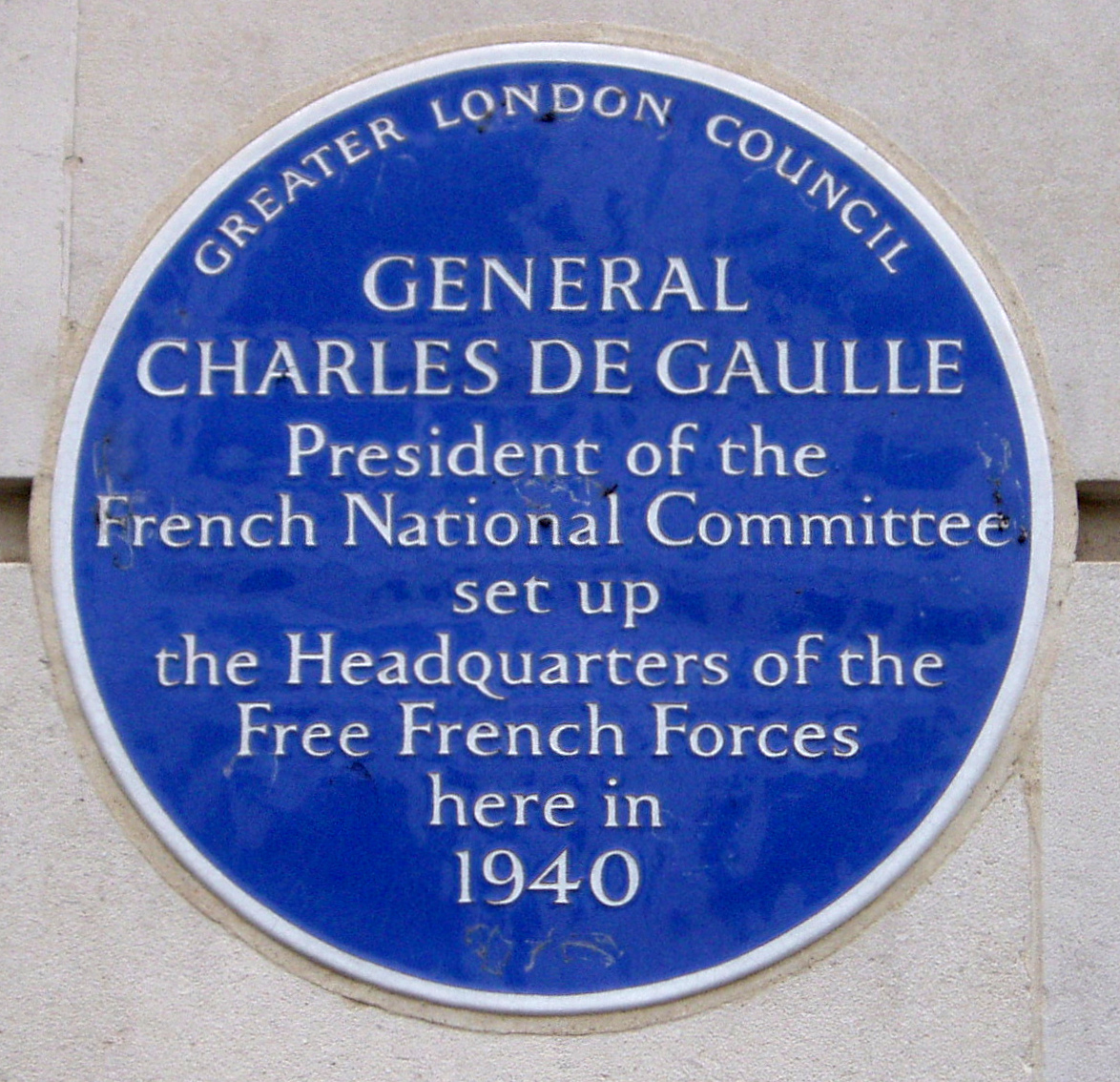
The plaque commemorating the headquarters of General de Gaulle at 4 Carlton Gardens.

De Gaulle's famous Appeal of 18 June was transmitted in French by the BBC and repeated on 22 June, the text having then been translated into English for the benefit of 10 Downing Street by Nancy Maurice, Spears's secretary. Towards the end of June 1940, Spears was appointed head of the British government's mission to de Gaulle, whose headquarters were finally established at 4 Carlton Gardens in London.

==== Aftermath of Dunkirk and Mers el Kebir ====
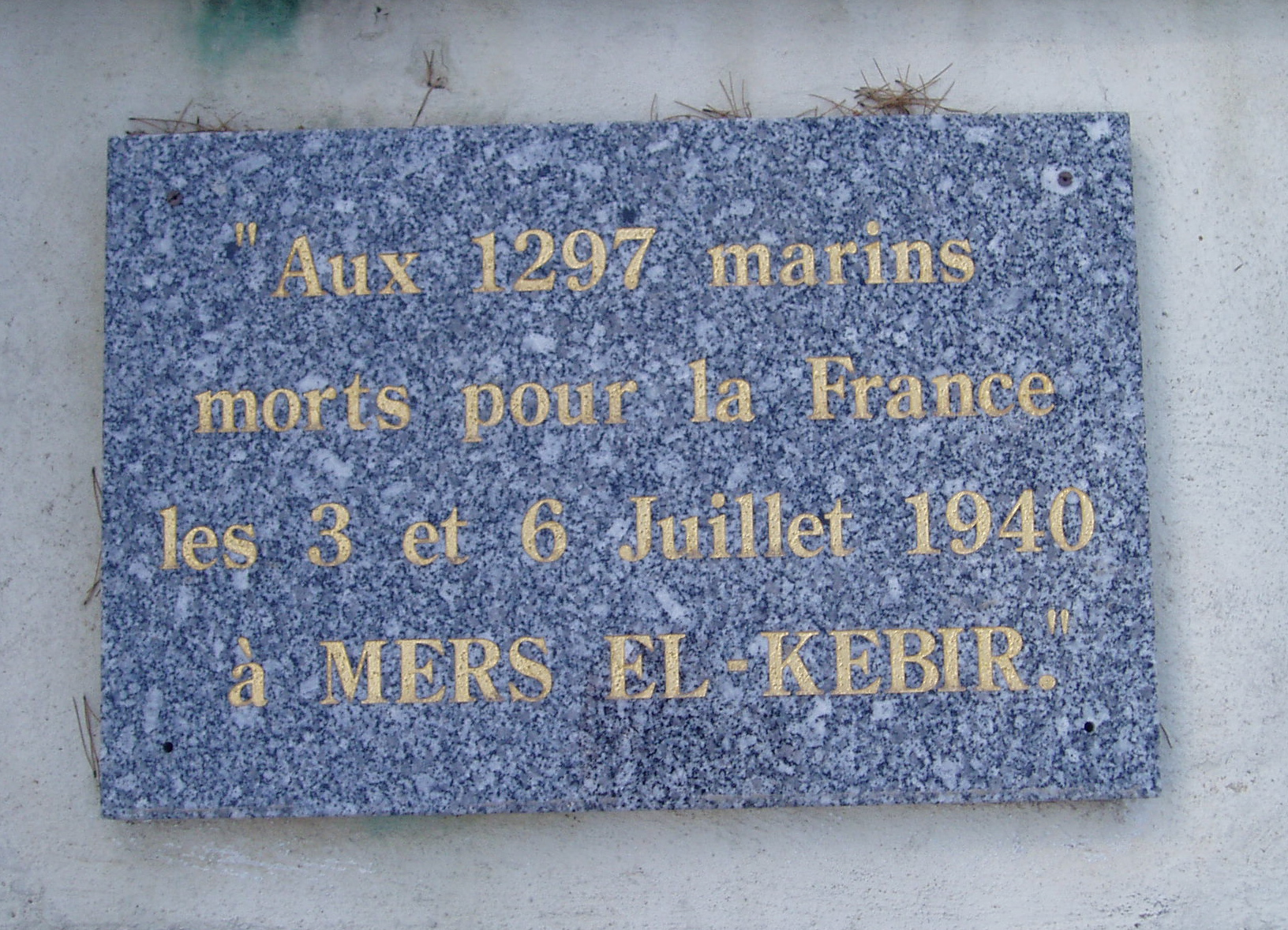
Memorial on the coastal path at Toulon to the French seamen who died on 3 July 1940 during the British bombardment of their ships in the harbour of Mers El Kebir.

Over 100,000 French troops were evacuated from Dunkirk during Operation Dynamo between 26 May and 4 June 1940, but the majority returned to France from ports in the west of England within a few days. On 3 July, Spears had the unpleasant task of informing de Gaulle of the British ultimatum to the French ships at anchor in the North African port of Mers El Kébir; this would result in the first phase of Operation Catapult, an action which led to the loss many French warships and the deaths of 1,297 French seamen. The attack caused great hostility towards Britain and made it even more difficult for de Gaulle to recruit men to his cause. De Gaulle, while regarding the naval action as 'inevitable', was initially uncertain whether he could still collaborate with Britain. Spears tried to encourage him and at the end of July in an unsuccessful attempt to rally support, flew to the internment camp at Aintree Racecourse near Liverpool, where French seamen who had been in British ports were taken as part of Operation Catapult. In the event, de Gaulle had only some 1,300 men at his disposal in Britain, the majority being those who had recently been evacuated from Narvik following the Norwegian Campaign.

==== Dakar – Operation Menace ====
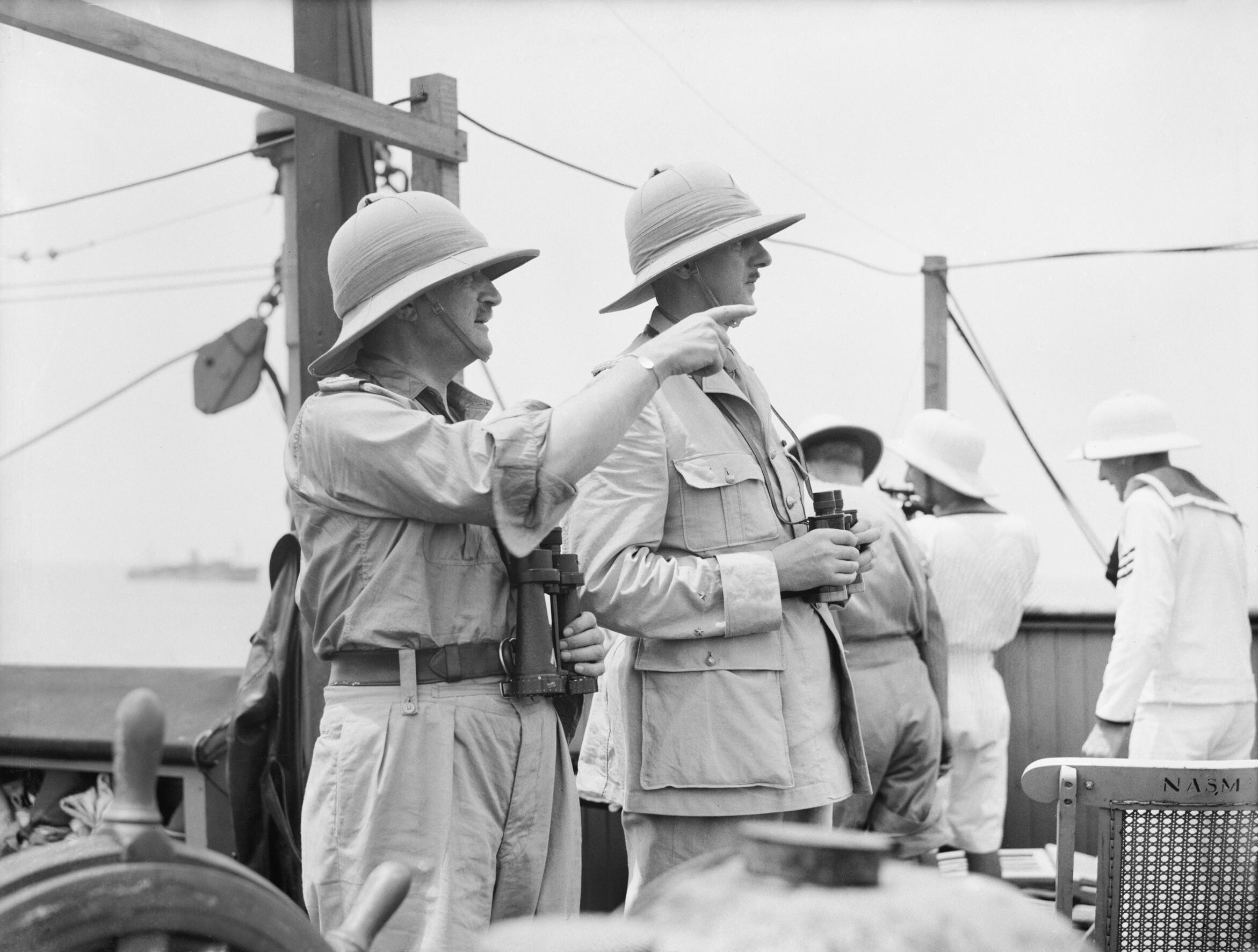
Spears and de Gaulle en route for Dakar in September 1940 aboard the Dutch liner, Westernland.

Winston Churchill pressed for action by the Free French to turn French colonies from the Vichy regime. The target was Dakar in French West Africa; the main reason being that it could become a base threatening shipping in the Atlantic. A show of force by the Royal Navy was planned coupled with a landing by de Gaulle's which, it was hoped, would convince the Vichy defenders to defect. Spears accompanied de Gaulle on the mission, (Operation Menace), with orders to report directly to the Prime Minister. However, security had been lax and the destination was said to be common talk among French troops in London.

While the task force was en route, it came in sight of a French fleet – including three cruisers – on its way from Toulon to Douala to recapture French Equatorial Africa which had declared for de Gaulle. Surprised, the French fleet sailed for Dakar instead, thus making the outcome of the expedition much more uncertain. Churchill was now of the opinion that the project should be abandoned, but de Gaulle insisted and a telegram from Spears to the Prime Minister stated, "I wish to insist to you personally and formally that the plan for the constitution of French Africa through Dakar should be upheld and carried out."

On 23 September 1940, a landing by de Gaulle's troops was repulsed and, in the ensuing naval engagement, two British capital ships and two cruisers were damaged while the Vichy French lost two destroyers and a submarine. Finally Churchill ordered the operation to be called off. The Free French had been snubbed by their countrymen; de Gaulle and Spears were deeply depressed, the latter fearing for his own reputation – and rightly so. The Daily Mirror wrote: "Dakar has claims to rank with the lowest depths of imbecility to which we have yet sunk". De Gaulle was further discredited with the Americans and began to criticise Spears openly, telling Churchill that he was 'intelligent but egotistical and hampering because of his unpopularity at the War Office etc.'. John Colville, Churchill's private secretary, wrote on 27 October 1940, "It is true that Spears' emphatic telegrams persuaded the Cabinet to revert to the Dakar scheme after it had, on the advice of the Chiefs of Staff, been abandoned".

=== De Gaulle and Spears in the Levant ===
The French flag with the Cross of Lorraine, emblem of the Free French.

Still acting as Churchill's personal representative to the Free French, Spears left England with de Gaulle for the Levant via Cairo in March 1941. They were received by British officers, including General Archibald Wavell, the British Commander in Chief Middle East, and also General Georges Catroux, the former Governor General of French Indo-China, who had been relieved of his post by the Vichy France regime of Marshal Philippe Pétain.

Wavell, the British Commander-in-Chief, wanted to negotiate with the Governor of French Somaliland, which was still loyal to Vichy France, and lift the blockade of that territory in exchange for the right to send supplies to British forces in Abyssinia via the railway from the coast to Addis Ababa. However, de Gaulle and Spears argued in favour of firmness, the former arguing that a detachment of his Free French should be sent to confront the Vichy Armistice Army troops in the hope that the latter would be persuaded to change sides. Wavell agreed, but was later overruled by Anthony Eden, who feared an open clash between the two French factions. British vacillations persisted against the advice of Spears and to the extreme irritation of de Gaulle.

==== Syria and Lebanon ====
More serious differences between Britain and de Gaulle soon emerged over Syria and Lebanon. De Gaulle and Spears held that it was essential to deny the Germans access to Vichy French Air Force bases in Syria from where they would threaten the Suez Canal. However, Wavell was reluctant to stretch his limited forces and did not want to risk a clash with the French in Syria.

The French in Syria had initially been in favour of continuing the struggle against Germany but had been snubbed by Wavell, who declined the offer of cooperation from three French divisions. By the time de Gaulle reached the Levant, Vichy had replaced any Frenchmen who were sympathetic towards Britain.

Having left the Middle East with de Gaulle on a visit to French Equatorial Africa, Spears had his first major row with the general who, in a fit of pique caused by 'some quite minor action by the British government', suddenly declared that the landing ground at Fort Lamy would no longer be available to British aircraft transiting Africa. Spears countered furiously by threatening to summon up British troops to take over the aerodrome and the matter blew over.

De Gaulle told Spears that the Vichy authorities in the Middle East were acting against the Free French and the British. French ships blockaded by the British at Alexandria were permitted to transmit coded messages which were anything but helpful to the British cause. Their crews were allowed to take leave in the Levant States where they stoked up anti-British feeling. They also brought back information about British naval and troop movements which would find its way back to Vichy. In Fulfilment of a Mission Spears writes bitterly about how Britain was providing pay for Vichy sailors who were allowed to remit money back to France. Their pay would, of course, be forfeited if they joined de Gaulle. However, his biggest bone of contention – one over which he frequently clashed with the Foreign Office and the Admiralty – was that a French ship, SS Providence, was allowed to sail unchallenged between Beirut and Marseille. It carried contraband 'and a living cargo of French soldiers and officials [prisoners] who were well disposed to us or who wished to continue the fight at our side'.

Presidential standard of the collaborationist Vichy Regime

De Gaulle and Spears held the view that the British at GHQ in Cairo were unwilling to accept that they had been duped over the level of collaboration between Germany and the Vichy-controlled states in the Levant. The British military authorities feared that a blockade of the Levant would cause hardship and thus antagonise the civilian population. However, Spears pointed out that the Vichy French were already unpopular with the local population – ordinary people resented being lorded over by defeated foreigners. He urged aggressive propaganda aimed at the Vichy French in support of the Free French and British policy. He felt that the Free French would be considered as something different as they were allies of Britain and enjoyed the dignity of fighting their enemy instead of submitting to him.

On 13 May 1941, the fears of de Gaulle and Spears were realised when German aircraft landed in Syria in support of the Iraqi rebel Rashid Ali, who was opposed to the pro-British Kingdom of Iraq. On 8 June, 30,000 troops (Indian Army, British, Australian, Free French and the Trans-Jordanian Frontier Force) invaded Lebanon and Syria in what was known as Operation Exporter. There was stiff resistance from the Vichy French and Spears commented bitterly on 'that strange class of Frenchmen who had developed a vigour in defeat which had not been apparent when they were defending their country'.

Spears soon became aware of the poor liaison which existed between the British Embassy in Cairo, the armed forces, Palestine and the Sudan. The arrival in Cairo in July 1941 of Oliver Lyttelton, who was a Minister of State and a member of the War Cabinet, improved matters considerably. The Middle East Defence Council was also formed – a body that Spears would later join.

In January 1942, having received the title of KBE, Spears was appointed the first British minister to Syria and Lebanon. Beirut still holds his name on one of its major streets, Rue Spears.

== Later life ==
Spears lost his parliamentary seat in the 1945 General Election, which saw the Conservative Party defeated in a landslide. The same year he accepted the position of chairman of the commercial firm Ashanti Goldfields. From 1948 to 1966 he was chairman of the Institute of Directors, frequently visiting West Africa. Spears published several books during the post-war period: Assignment to Catastrophe (2 vols., 1954); Two Men Who Saved France: Pétain and De Gaulle (1966); and his own autobiography, The Picnic Basket (1967).

In 1947 he founded the Anglo-Arab Association.

Spears was created a baronet, of Warfield, Berkshire, on 30 June 1953. He died on 27 January 1974 at the age of 87 at the Heatherwood Hospital at Ascot. A memorial service at St. Margaret's, Westminster followed on 7 March. The trumpeters of the 11th Hussars sounded a fanfare; the French and Lebanese ambassadors were in attendance. General Sir Edward Louis Spears lies buried at Warfield alongside the graves of his first wife, May, and his son, Michael.

== Tragedy of his life ==
In the foreword to Fulfilment of a Mission, the account by Spears of his service in the Levant, John Terraine, writes of 'the tragedy of his life'. By this he meant that someone who should have been a warm friend of de Gaulle had become an intractable and spiteful enemy. His boyhood had been spent in France. He was happy in France, he liked the spirit of the people. He liked the sailors of Brittany and the peasants of Burgundy. He understood their wit. It amused him to talk to them and to be with them. It had been a very bitter experience to find himself opposed and having to oppose French policy so often. That, he said, had been the tragedy of his life. Terraine comments further, "If Mr Graham Greene had not already made good use of it, the title of Fulfilment of a Mission might just as well have been, The End of an Affair.

== Linguistic competence ==
In October 1939, he led a delegation of British MPs to France and spoke on French Radio. After the broadcast, listeners protested that his speech had been read for him because 'an Englishman without an accent did not exist'! In February 1940, he gave a lecture on the British war effort to a large and distinguished audience in Paris. Fluent though he was, he nevertheless felt it would be helpful to attend lessons with an elocution teacher who coached leading French actors. It must be supposed that he also spoke some German thanks to the two years which he had spent at a boarding school in Germany.

Despite his linguistic competence, Spears hated interpreting. He realised that it required qualifications beyond a mere knowledge of two languages. At the conference at Tours on 13 June 1940, he had the awesome responsibility of translating Paul Reynaud's French into English and Winston Churchill's English into French. The final phase of the Battle of France and the destiny of two nations were at stake; it promised to be the gravest of the meetings so far held between the two governments. Furthermore, he was aware that others in the room were completely conversant with both languages and that most of them would have thought of the word that he was searching for before he had found it.

== Media ==
Sir Edward Spears appears as an interviewee in numerous episodes of the 1964 documentary series The Great War, especially in reference to the major roles he played as liaison to the French Fifth Army in the episodes Our hats we doff to General Joffre, detailing the Great Retreat to the Marne and This business may last a long time, detailing the First Battle of the Marne and the subsequent Race to the Sea. He appeared in the 1969 French-West German documentary The Sorrow and the Pity about collaboration in Vichy France. He also appeared near the end of his life, in the episode "France Falls" of the landmark 1974 documentary series, The World at War.

== Notes and sources ==
Parliament of the United Kingdom
Preceded by Oscar Guest	Member of Parliament for Loughborough; 1922–1924	Succeeded by Frank Rye
Preceded by George Middleton	Member of Parliament for Carlisle; 1931–1945	Succeeded by Edgar Grierson
Baronetage of the United Kingdom
New creation	Baronet (of Warfield, Berks); 1953–1974	Extinct
