= Anglo-French Supreme War Council =

World War II war council (1939-1940)

The Anglo-French Supreme War Council (SWC; French: Conseil suprême interallié, 'inter-allied supreme council') was established to oversee joint military strategy at the start of the Second World War. Most of its deliberations took place during the period of the Phoney War, with its first meeting at Abbeville on 12 September 1939. The final three sessions were held in France (Paris, Briare and Tours) during the German blitzkrieg of May and June 1940.

== Meetings of the SWC ==
=== During the Phoney War ===
Its first meeting was at Abbeville on 12 September 1939 (the Abbeville Conference) with Britain represented by the Prime Minister, Neville Chamberlain, and Lord Chatfield, the French delegation headed by the Prime Minister, Édouard Daladier, and General Maurice Gamelin. The participants assessed the consequences of German invasion on Poland and ultimately decided to leave Poland with no military assistance.

The next meeting took place at Hove on 22 September 1939. At both meetings, discussion centred on Italy and whether it would be possible to deploy military force at Salonika or Istanbul without provoking Benito Mussolini. With their huge army mobilised but idle, the French feared an ebbing of military morale and were accordingly bellicose and impatient for action; Britain, on the other hand, shrank from such measures. At the Hove meeting there was also discussion about munitions production and reinforcements to the air and anti-aircraft defences in France. The British party at Hove consisted of Neville Chamberlain (prime minister), Lord Halifax (Foreign Secretary), Sir Alexander Cadogan (Permanent Under-Secretary at the Foreign Office) and Edward Bridges (Cabinet Secretary). France was represented by Édouard Daladier (prime minister), General Maurice Gamelin, Admiral François Darlan (C-in-C French Navy), Raoul Dautry (minister of munitions), and Jean Monnet (chairman of the Franco-British Economic Co-ordination Committee). Chamberlain stated that the Allies could not prevent a German intervention into Yugoslavia. At this and the two further meetings in 1939, on 17 November (in London) and 19 December (in Paris), the French turned down a British scheme to bomb industrial targets in the Ruhr if the Germans were to invade Belgium. The French view was that such action would not stop the invasion of Belgium, but it would risk retaliation by the Luftwaffe against Britain and France.

The meeting of the SWC held in Paris on 5 February 1940 was the first to be attended by Winston Churchill, who, as First Lord of the Admiralty, had been invited to participate by Neville Chamberlain. Here, the British rejected France's proposal for an expedition to Petsamo in Finland to help the Finns in the Winter War for fear that this would provoke the Soviet Union. Sir Alexander Cadogan, the Permanent Under-Secretary of State for Foreign Affairs, described it as a "silly scheme". However, a French plan to send forces to Narvik was approved, dependent on agreement from Norway and Sweden. The meeting was described by General Ironside as having been harmonious with "everyone purring with pleasure. Wondered if we should all be in the state if we had a little adversity to touch us up." In the event, Norway and Sweden, fearful of compromising their neutrality, did not consent to the Narvik plan. The Scandinavian view was interpreted differently by Britain and France. Britain took the view that the operation should be cancelled, but France maintained that it had been agreed that the operation should proceed regardless of opposition. However, events overtook the impasse, when, on 13 March, the Finns agreed an armistice with the Soviet Union.

The sixth meeting of the SWC was held in London on 28 March 1940 with Britain represented by the Prime Minister, Neville Chamberlain, Lord Halifax, Winston Churchill, Oliver Stanley and Sir Kingsley Wood. It was the first to be attended by Paul Reynaud, the new French prime minister, who was accompanied by César Campinchi, the naval minister, Victor Laurent-Eynac the aviation minister, M. Charles Corbin (the French ambassador), M. Alexis Léger, General Maurice Gamelin, Admiral Darlan, General Joseph Vuillemin and General Koeltz. The British were firmly opposed to French plans to bomb Russian oil fields in the Caucasus in order to deprive Germany of Soviet oil supplies. The French agreed to what later became known as Operation Royal Marine, the floating of mines up the Rhine to damage bridges and disrupt barge traffic. However, Reynaud was unable to obtain the approval of his cabinet for such a mining of the Rhine; accordingly, the British refused to go along with the plan to mine the waters off the Norwegian coast at Narvik. Politically, the main thrust of this meeting was a joint communiqué declaring, "Both Governments mutually undertake that during the present war they will neither negotiate nor conclude an armistice or treaty of peace except by mutual agreement. They undertake to maintain after conclusion of peace a community of action for so long as may be necessary".

In Paris, on 5 April, at a meeting not of the SWC, Churchill pressed for Operation Royal Marine, but, fearing German reprisals, the French refused to countenance any mining of the Rhine. Churchill, therefore, decided that Britain alone would undertake the mining off Narvik; this action (Operation Wilfred) was planned for 8 April. However, in the meantime, the Germans had launched Operation Weserübung, the invasion of Norway and Denmark. Paul Reynaud, Édouard Daladier and Admiral Darlan flew to London for an emergency meeting of the SWC on 9 April. Here, it was resolved that an Anglo-French task force would be sent to Norway, but the operation (Plan R 4) was a failure. Not only did it prove impossible to stop the export of iron ore from Scandinavia to Germany but also the troops had to be evacuated, in what was known as Operation Alphabet.

A further meeting of the council took place in Paris on 22 and 23 April, when it was agreed that the Allies would stand fast in Norway; Trondheim and Narvik would continue to be the main objectives. It was also decided that the RAF would, without further discussion, bomb the Ruhr if the Germans were to invade the Netherlands or Belgium.

When the Supreme War Council met on 27 April, the French mistakenly hoped that Britain would postpone the evacuation from Central Norway. Reynaud was furious, deploring "the old men [in London] who do not know how to take a risk" and returning to Paris with influenza. There was acrimony on both sides; the French convinced that Albion was indeed perfidious and the British stereotyping their ally as "temperamental".

=== During the Battle of France ===
==== Crisis meetings in Paris ====
At 7.30 on the morning of 15 May, Winston Churchill, who had been prime minister for just five days, received a desperate telephone call from Paul Reynaud announcing that "the French were beaten ... that they had lost the battle." Reynaud begged for all the aircraft and troops that could be spared. The British Prime Minister agreed to fly to Paris the following day to attend what would be the first crisis meeting of the SWC.

On 16 May, Churchill flew to Paris, with Sir John Dill, vice-chief of the Imperial General Staff, General Hastings Ismay, his deputy as defence minister, and Air Marshal Joubert de la Ferté, deputy chief of the Air Staff. The delegation arrived in Paris during the afternoon and found the French in a state verging on paralysis. General Maurice Gamelin explained that the Germans had broken through on a 50 km front and had already advanced 60 km inward from Sedan. When Churchill asked about the strategic reserve, Gamelin replied that there was none. Churchill then inquired when and where Gamelin proposed to attack the flanks of the bulge. Gamelin replied with a hopeless shrug and the famous words: "Inferiority of numbers, inferiority of equipment, inferiority of method." Six more squadrons were requested for France, above the four additional RAF squadrons which had already that morning been authorised. If the French request were heeded, it would leave just 25 squadrons for home defence, the final limit. Churchill explained that a minimum of 39 fighter squadrons was needed to defend British war industries. Bomber aircraft, he argued, would be better employed attacking the Ruhr; they were unsuitable against tanks. However, the same evening, Churchill warned his War Cabinet that more aircraft should be committed for fear that French resistance would crumble as swiftly as that of the Poles. French morale was accordingly raised, but matters were not as they seemed. The six extra squadrons were to be based in Kent and would operate from French airfields only during daylight hours. Moreover, three would fly in the mornings and three in the afternoons, and three had already been committed to France as part of Lord Gort's air power. Over the coming three to four days, the strength of the British Advanced Air Striking Force (AASF) would be further reduced.

There was a meeting of the SWC in Paris on 22 May 1940.

A private meeting between Churchill and Reynaud took place over lunch in London on 26 May. Both men deal with the meeting in their memoirs, but the precise details are confused. Churchill says that the French prime minister "dwelt not obscurely with the possible French withdrawal from the war". Reynaud pressed for more British air support and warned that if the Battle of France were lost, Pétain would urge strongly for an armistice. However, it seems that Reynaud did not directly ask Britain to release France from its promise made on 28 March not to enter into a separate armistice with Germany. Another meeting was held later the same day, now with Churchill, Chamberlain, Attlee, and Anthony Eden. At this meeting, a suggestion was discussed which had previously been voiced by Lord Halifax, the involvement of Italy in a peace conference. If Benito Mussolini would help to safeguard the independence of Britain and France, it would be possible to discuss Italian claims in the Mediterranean. The latter involved the coast of French Somaliland, Djibouti and the Addis Ababa railway; another concession would be the internationalisation of Malta, Gibraltar and Suez. However, the British opposed such concessions, and Churchill confirmed as much in a telegram to Paris the same evening. Despite a great deal of internal opposition, the French made an approach to Mussolini at the end of the month, but it was scornfully ignored by Rome anyway.

On 31 May 1940, Churchill flew again to Paris for a meeting of the SWC, this time with Clement Attlee and Generals John Dill and Hastings Ismay. Discussions were held at the French Ministry of War on the deteriorating military situation with a French delegation consisting of Reynaud, Philippe Pétain and Maxime Weygand. Also present was Churchill's personal representative to the French Prime Minister, General Sir Edward Spears. Three main points were considered: Narvik, the Dunkirk evacuation and the prospect of an Italian invasion of France. Reynaud complained that at the evacuation, Operation Dynamo, more British troops had been taken off than French. Churchill promised to do everything to redress the balance. During discussions after the meeting, a group formed around Churchill, Pétain and Spears. One of the French officials mentioned the possibility of a separate surrender. Speaking to Pétain, Spears pointed out that such an event would provoke a blockade of France by Britain and the bombardment of all French ports in German hands. Churchill declared that Britain would fight on whatever happened.

==== Meeting at Briare ====
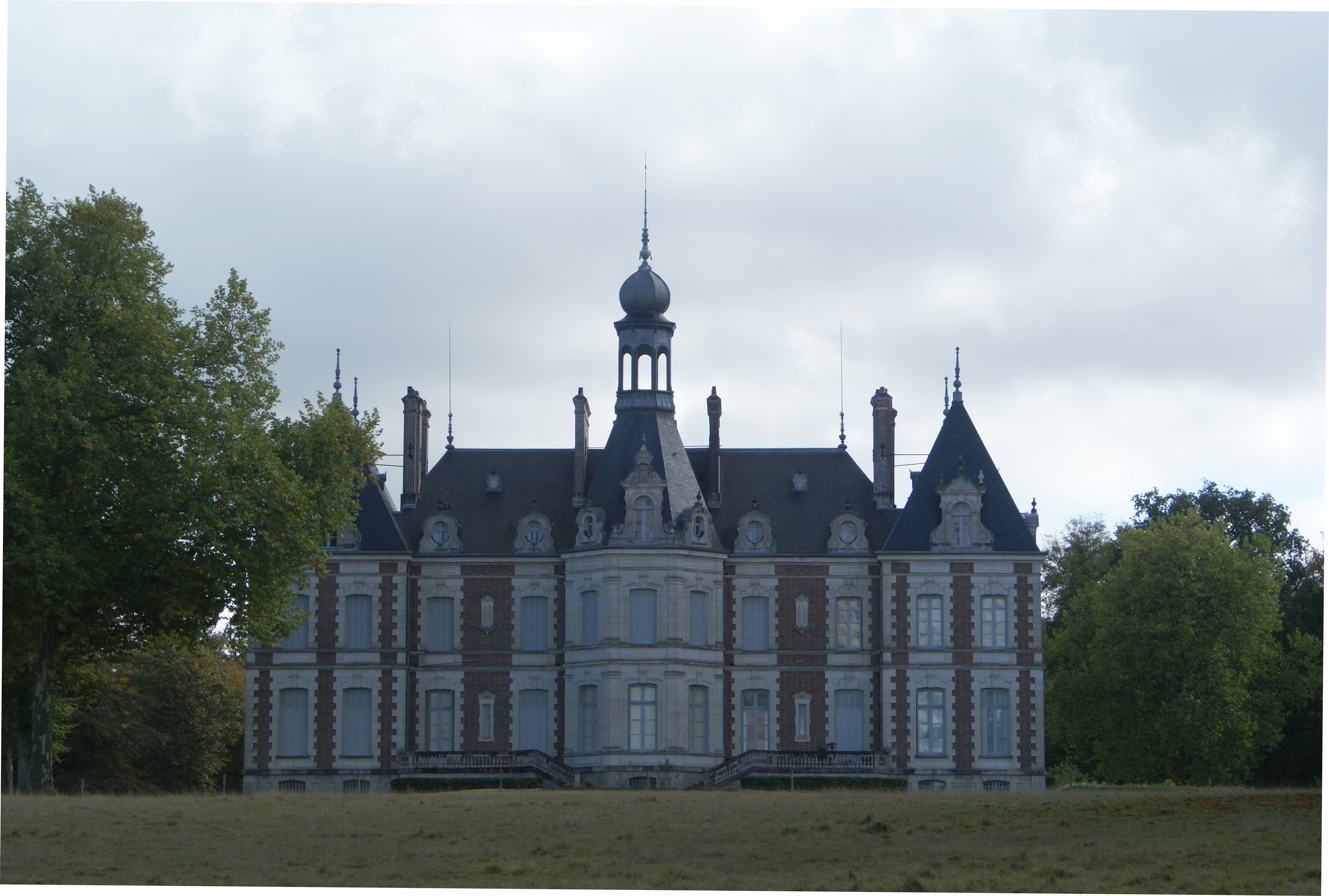
Chateau du Muguet, in Breteau near Briare

The penultimate session was in France, on 11/12 June at the Chateau du Muguet near Briare, where the French army headquarters had withdrawn. Winston Churchill, Anthony Eden, General Sir John Dill (chief of the Imperial General Staff), General Ismay and other staff officers, including General Sir Edward Spears, met the French leader. Reynaud and his cabinet had been forced to leave Paris and the meeting took place at the chateau which was HQ of General Maxime Weygand. Also present was General Charles de Gaulle; Spears had not met him before and was impressed with his bearing. As wrangling continued over the level of support from Britain, Spears suddenly became aware that "the battle of France was over and that no one believed in miracles". The next day, Weygand's catastrophic account of the military situation reinforced his pessimism. Despite assurances from Admiral François Darlan, the British were worried that the powerful French fleet might fall into German hands.

==== Last-ditch talks at Tours ====
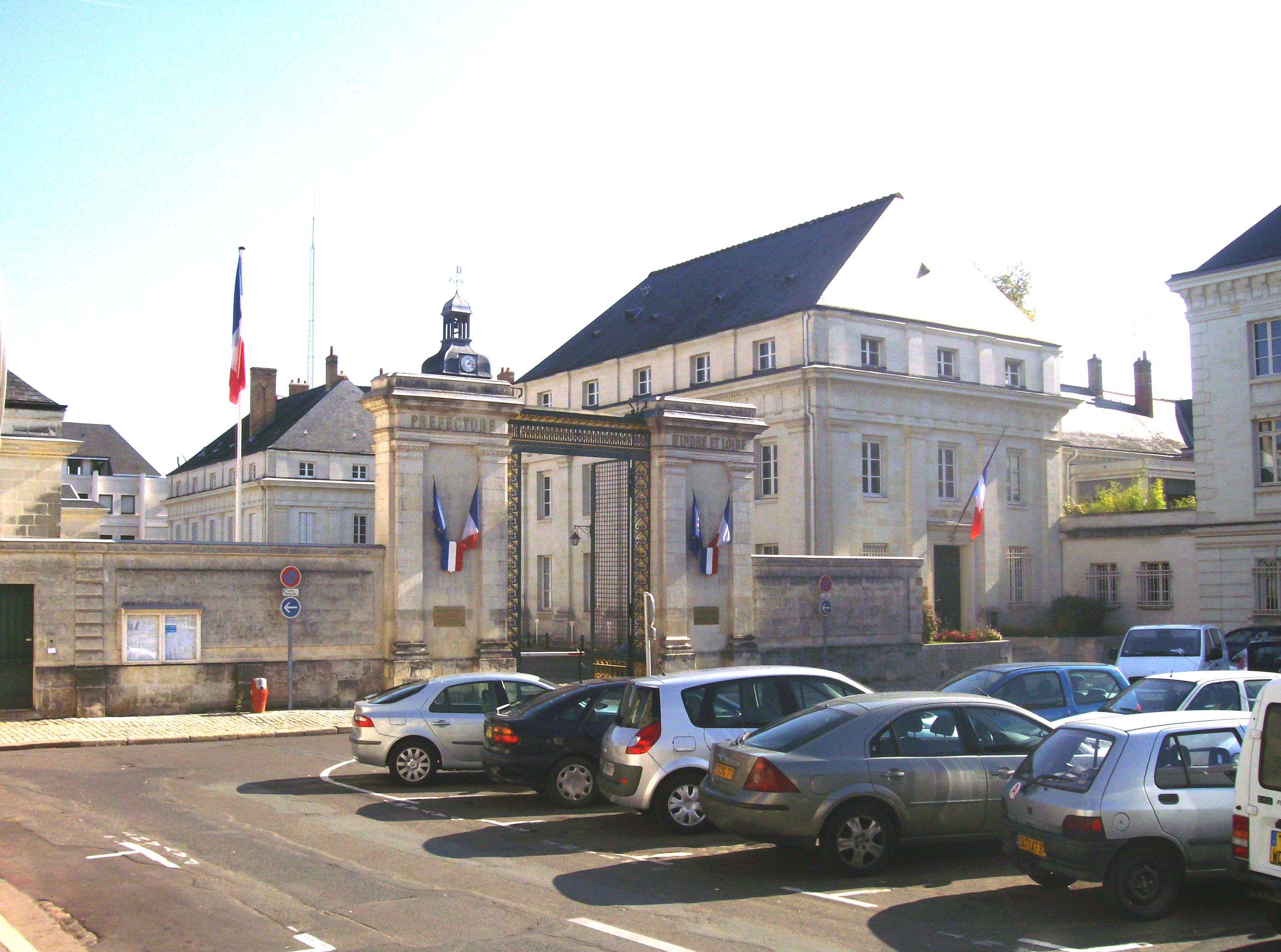
The Préfecture at Tours – scene of crisis talks.

What would prove to be the final meeting of the Anglo-French Supreme War Council took place at the préfecture in Tours on 13 June. The British delegation was composed of Churchill, Lord Halifax, Lord Beaverbrook, Sir Alexander Cadogan, General "Pug" Ismay and General Spears. The French Prime Minister, Paul Reynaud, was accompanied by Paul Baudouin, a member of the War Committee. Spears found the atmosphere quite different from that at Briare, where Churchill had expressed goodwill, sympathy and sorrow; now, it was like a business meeting, with the British keenly appraising the situation from its own point of view. Reynaud declared that unless immediate help was assured by the US, the French government would have to give up the struggle. He acknowledged that the two countries had agreed never to conclude a separate peace at a meeting of the SWC London on 28 March 1940, but France was physically incapable of carrying on. The news was received by the British with shock and horror. Churchill said with determination, "We must fight, we will fight, and that is why we must ask our friends to fight on." Prime Minister Reynaud acknowledged that Britain would continue the war, affirming that France would also continue the struggle from North Africa, if necessary, if there were a chance of success. That success could come only if America were prepared to join the fray. The French leader called for British understanding, asking again for France to be released from her obligation not to conclude a separate peace now that she could do no more.

===== Churchill fails to address French cabinet =====
The day ended in confusion; Churchill flew back to London without speaking to the French cabinet, as had been promised by Reynaud. The ministers were dismayed and angry; Spears was depressed, realising that "an opportunity that might not recur had been missed". He was at a loss to understand why a meeting had not taken place: had Reynaud simply forgotten? Did Reynaud wish to be the one to explain the situation to the ministers? In any event, his ministers were disillusioned and felt abandoned. Spears believed that the event played its part in swaying the majority of the cabinet towards surrender. He was sure that "by the night of 13 June, the possibility of France remaining in the war had almost disappeared". The only hope rested on the decision of President Roosevelt on if America now join the war.

== Military participation ==
When the composition of the SWC was decided, the commander-in-chief of the British Expeditionary Force (BEF), Lord Gort was not a member; yet his French counterpart, General Maurice Gamelin, was. In the view of General Edward Spears the failure to include the British C-in-C was a mistake: "No government should ever lose effective touch with the commander of its army."

== Organisations associated with the SWC ==
Associated bodies were the Anglo-French Purchasing Committee and the Anglo-French Co-ordinating Committee. The latter, announced in The Times on 28 November and set up in December 1939 was chaired by Jean Monnet; it was responsible for joint economic planning and oversaw ten executive committees which were created in January of the following year. In December 1939, an Anglo-French financial agreement was signed to ensure that contributions to the war effort would be made according to the respective national wealth of each country – France would contribute 40% with Britain responsible for 60%. In addition to the latter, trading agreements and industrial agreements were signed on 16 February 1940 and 7 March 1940 respectively. Paul Reynaud spoke of "a unity of purpose" which had created a solidarity between the two countries which was more than an alliance. It was agreed that there would be no alteration to the rate of exchange between the two currencies during the war and that each country would be able to cover its requirements in the other's currency without the need to find gold.

== Diplomatic activity in parallel with the SWC ==
Officials from both sides endeavoured to find ways to make the British and the French view each other more favourably. The British Ambassador, Sir Eric Phipps, asked the Minister of Information (MOI) to provide the French press with details of the arrival of British forces to prove that Britain was resolved to contribute fully to the war effort. However, it created tensions with the War Office, which imposed censorship. As a result, nothing could be revealed about the British Army and the Royal Air Force in France. That led to absurd situations, as when an American correspondent asked for the text of a leaflet dropped by the Royal Air Force over Germany. The request was refused by the censors on the grounds that "they were not allowed to disclose information which might be of value to the enemy". In October 1939, the disparity in troop numbers became a cause for concern in France, which had mobilised 3.5 million men; yet a mere 158,000 British troops had been sent across the English Channel. The Ambassador reported to London and hoped that Britain would declare emphatically that these were just an advance guard and that reinforcements were being swiftly despatched.

The Ambassador further asked the MOI to ensure that there were more articles about France in British newspapers. The few that were published were likely to offend: "the Englishman in France must be severe with begging children and be prepared to find the French mean and grasping". There was a suggestion that "La Marseillaise" be played in cinemas after "God Save the King" and another that the two languages be made compulsory for pupils in each country. It was even put forward that unemployed French chefs in London should tour British schools to introduce children to French cuisine.

A more ambitious idea came from a Foreign Office official: to allow the two countries to operate internationally as a "single unit" after the war. A committee was established under Lord Maurice Hankey to examine the possibilities of such a union, thus presaging the proposal made by Britain on 16 June 1940, an attempt to prevent the French from seeking a separate armistice with Germany.

== See also ==
- Diplomatic history of World War II
