= Victor Bourret =

French Army general

- Born: 22 September 1877; Bastia, Haute-Corse
- Died: 5 August 1949 (aged 71); Cérans-Foulletourte, Sarthe
- Military career
- Allegiance: French Third Republic
- Branch: French Army
- Service years: 1895–1945
- Rank: General
- Conflicts: World War I; World War II

Victor Bourret (22 September 1877 – 5 August 1949) was a French general and military administrator.

Born on 22 September 1877 in Bastia on Corsica, he was the son of a gendarme. He joined up in 1895 and attended the École Nationale des Sous-Officiers d’Active in Saint-Maixent-l'École in 1900 and the École Militaire in 1913. He served in World War I working on various staffs.

Between the wars he held various posts at the head of infantry units or in the Ministry of War, where he was chief of Édouard Daladier's military cabinet three times between February 1932 and July 1937. Assessed by the British as a "political general ... of little of no worth," he was alleged to have formed a screen which restricted contact between the minister and the military officers under his command. During this period he was promoted Brigadier-General in 1932, Major-General in 1935, Lieutenant-General in 1936 and General in 1939.

On the outbreak of World War II, Bourret was given command of the Fifth Army, stationed in Alsace. Subordinates who had been critics of Bourret during his time at the ministry grew to admire him as a commander. Amongst the officers under his command was Colonel Charles de Gaulle, who was in command of the army's five scattered battalions of tanks.

During the battle of France, on 17 June 1940, he was replaced as commander of 5th Army by Charles-Marie Condé and placed in command of the reserves. As the army retreated, he went to Fort de Girancourt, part of the outdated Séré de Rivières fortifications He was taken prisoner on 25 June 1940 at Gérardmer and spent five years in captivity in the Königstein Fortress in Saxony. He was released on 9 May 1945 and was back in France 3 days later.

After the war he wrote a monograph about the fall of France entitled "The Tragedy of the French Army". He died on 5 August 1949 in Cérans-Foulletourte.
