= Iter (disambiguation) =

ITER is short for the International Thermonuclear Experimental Reactor. Iter, Latin for "road" or "way", can also refer to:

- Ancient Egyptian Schoenus, a unit of length similar to a league
- Eyre (legal term), a medieval English court circuit
- Iterator, a computer programming function
- Cerebral aqueduct

== See also ==
- Itter (disambiguation)
- List of Latin phrases (I)
- Ancient Egyptian units of measurement
- Iteration (disambiguation)
