= Itter (disambiguation) =

Itter is a municipality in the Kitzbühel District in the Austrian state of Tyrol.

Itter may also refer to:

== People ==
- Carole Itter (1935–1995), Canadian artist, writer and filmmaker
- Diane Itter (1946–1989), American fiber artist
- Gian-Luca Itter (born 1999), German footballer
- Pascal Itter (born 1995), German footballer

== Rivers in Germany ==
- Itter (Diemel), a river of Hesse and North Rhine-Westphalia, tributary of the Diemel
- Itter (Eder), a river of Hesse, tributary of the Edersee
- Itter (Neckar), a river of Hesse and Baden-Württemberg, tributary of the Neckar
- Itter (Rhine), a river of North Rhine-Westphalia, tributary of the Rhine

== Other ==
- Itter Castle, a 19th-century castle in Itter, Tyrol
- Düsseldorf-Itter, an urban borough of Düsseldorf, Germany
- Ittre (Dutch: Itter), a Walloon municipality, Belgium
- Itter Brass, a brass quintet from the Netherlands
