= Reiteration =

Reiteration is making an iteration again and again. It may refer to:

- Tremolo, a trembling effect in music
- Reiteration, a virtual rule of inference in mathematical logic
- "Reiteration", a 1959 song from Coolin' by the Prestige All Stars.

== See also ==
- Reiterate, a GRITS album
- Iteration (disambiguation)
- Repetition (disambiguation)
