= Josef Gangl =

German officer (1910–1945)

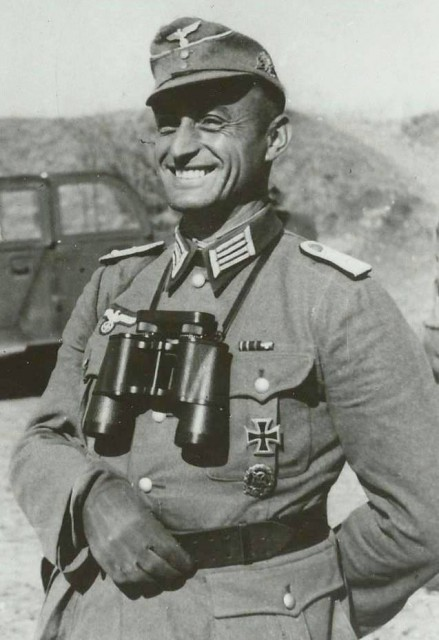
- Born: 12 September 1910; Obertraubling, Bezirksamts Regensburg, Kingdom of Bavaria, German Empire
- Died: 5 May 1945 (aged 34); Itter Castle, Alpine and Danube Reichsgau, Nazi Germany
- Burial place: Forest Cemetery in Wörgl (War Grave Section), Sepp-Gangl-Straße
- Spouse: Walburga Renz (m. 1935)
- Military career
- Allegiance: Weimar Republic; Nazi Germany; Austrian resistance
- Branch: Reichsheer; German Army
- Service years: 1928–1945 / Rank Major
- Conflicts: World War II; Saar Offensive; Phoney War; Operation Barbarossa; Normandy landings; Ardennes Counteroffensive; Battle of Castle Itter †
- Awards: Iron Cross; German Cross in Gold
- Other work: Farmer

Josef "Sepp" Gangl (12 September 1910 – 5 May 1945) was a German major of the Wehrmacht who became a member of the Austrian Resistance very late in the Second World War. He was killed in action on May 5, 1945, at Itter Castle, Tyrol. He took part in the defense of Castle Itter against troops of the 17th SS Panzer Grenadier Division "Götz von Berlichingen" with soldiers of the Wehrmacht, the US Army and French prisoners, and lost his life in the process when he took a bullet to protect former French prime minister Paul Reynaud. He is remembered as a hero of the Austrian Resistance against the Nazi regime.

== Life ==
=== Youth ===
Josef Gangl was born on September 12, 1910, in Obertraubling, Kingdom of Bavaria, the son of an official of the Royal Bavarian State Railways and a former shop assistant. When he was a toddler, the family moved to Peißenberg in Upper Bavaria, where Josef's younger siblings were born. He attended the elementary and continuing education school until Easter 1927, and then worked as a farmer for the next 18 months.

=== Reichswehr ===
On November 1, 1928, Gangl joined the Reichswehr, which was then limited to 100,000 men, in order to begin a career as a professional NCO in Artillery Regiment 7 in Nuremberg. He stayed there until September 1929, in order to serve in Artillery Regiment 5 with headquarters in Ulm, although he served in the 8th Battery/III. Battalion in Ludwigsburg.

=== Wehrmacht ===
He became part of the newly established 25th Artillery Regiment in Ludwigsburg in 1935, and married the Ludwigsburg saleswoman Walburga Renz (1909–1978). Together they had two children: daughter Sieglinde, married Weikert (b. 13 August 1936) and Dr. oec. Norbert Gangl.

Gangl was promoted to Oberfeldwebel in November 1938. From October 1939, he was to study at an officer school of the Wehrmacht. However, his regiment was stationed in the Saar-Palatinate on the border with France, preparing for war. There, on September 7, 1939, eleven French divisions, 25 km wide, crossed the border and advanced about 8 km into German territory (they withdrew within two weeks, on orders from Gamelin). This was Gangl's first combat during the Second World War. He spent six months in hospitals in the following months of the "Phoney War", returning to his regiment on May 14, 1940, to take part in the Western campaign, in which he commanded a reconnaissance unit of the 25th Infantry Division of the Wehrmacht. After the Armistice of Compiègne, Gangl served as an instructor in the artillery replacement department 25. After a short home leave in August 1940, he was an instructor at a base in Taus in the Protectorate of Bohemia and Moravia. He began a one-month training at the artillery school in Jüterbog on November 25, 1940.

On June 22, 1941, Gangl took part in the motorized artillery regiment 25 as part of Army Group South in Ukraine on the Eastern Front, where he commanded a battery with 105 mm howitzers in the battle for Kyiv. He was awarded the Iron Cross 2nd class on August 20, 1941. He was promoted to first lieutenant in January 1942, and he received the Iron Cross 1st Class on February 12, 1942. Gangl became the commander of a Nebelwerfer Unit in the 25th Artillery Regiment on April 24, 1942. He held this position on the Eastern Front, until he was assigned as commander of the Nebelwerfer replacement and training department 7 in Höchstädt an der Donau in January 1944. He went to the Battalion and Detachment Commanders' School (Bataillons- und Abteilungsführerschule) in Antwerp for a month in February 1944. On March 4, 1944, Gangl was transferred to the new Werfer-Regiment 83 in Celle, which belonged to Werfer-Brigade 7. With this he marched to France in May 1944 commanding the II. Battalion.

After the Allied invasion of Normandy, he marched with the Werfer-Brigade to Caen on June 7, 1944, where it was placed under the 12th SS Panzer Division "Hitlerjugend" ("Hitler Youth") and played an important role in the defense of the city. The Werfer-Brigade 7 escaped from the Falaise Pocket with heavy losses in August. In November it was reorganized in Prüm in the Eifel as Volks-Werfer-Brigade 7 with new equipment. Gangl participated with the brigade in the Ardennes offensive (Battle of the Bulge), in the subsequent general retreat and in February 1945 in the unsuccessful defense of Saarbrücken. He was awarded the German Cross in Gold on March 8, 1945.

Shortly afterwards he was promoted to major, still with the Werfer-Regiment 83. Werfer-Brigade 7 had meanwhile lost half of its men and no longer had any Nebelwerfer equipment. Their commander, General Kurt Paape, ordered the commanders of his battalions near Peißenberg to fight their way to Tyrol with them and take part in the defense of the Alpine fortress. Gangl met with Lieutenant General Georg Ritter von Hengl in mid-April, who assigned him and the remnants of his association to the Giehl combat group under Lieutenant Colonel Johann Giehl in Wörgl.

=== Resistance in Austria ===
A few days after his arrival in Wörgl, Gangl contacted the local group of Austrian resistance under Alois Mayr. He provided the resistance fighters with information and weapons. It was decided that the execution of Johann Giehl's order to defend Wörgl against the Americans to the end (to break bridges and block paths) should be prevented, and also to liberate the prominent French prisoners from the nearby Itter Castle. However, parts of the Giehl combat group in Niederaudorf were attacked by the 12th US Armored Division on May 3, 1945, and suffered heavy casualties. Von Hengl had his troops withdrawn from Wörgl and Itter, whereupon units of the Waffen-SS moved in. In the meantime, many residents of Wörgl had already hung white flags out of the windows. According to an order from Heinrich Himmler, all male residents of such homes were to be shot. Gangl, like Mayr, saw it as his obligation to stay in place to protect the residents from reprisals with his soldiers. Together with ten comrades from his Nebelwerfer ("smoke launcher", lit. "fog thrower") Regiment 83, he remained in Wörgl against Hengl's order to withdraw.

On May 4, 1945, at 11 a.m., the Czech cook Andreas Krobot travelled to Gangl, coming by bike from Itter Castle. He came asking for immediate help for the prisoners there, because an attack by the Waffen-SS on the castle was imminent. Gangl, who did not want to sacrifice his men in an "Ascension" (suicide/himmelfahrt) Command and had promised to get them through alive, was forced to drive white-flagged towards the Americans and ask for help. In Kufstein, 8 km away, he met an American reconnaissance unit under the command of Captain John C. "Jack" Lee. Together they moved with 14 US soldiers and Gangl and ten of his former artillerymen to Itter Castle. Gangl called Alois Mayr again for help, whereupon two other Wehrmacht soldiers and the young resistance fighter Hans Waltl drove to the castle. The liberated French prisoners also took part in the fight. On the morning of May 5, about 100 to 150 men from the 17th SS Panzer Grenadier Division "Götz von Berlichingen" attacked. Gangl was fatally hit by a sniper while trying to get former French Prime Minister Paul Reynaud out of the line of fire. At around 4:00 p.m., a relief unit from the 142nd US Infantry Regiment reached the castle and defeated the besiegers, capturing about 100 SS men. The Battle for Itter Castle was one of two times where the US Army and the Wehrmacht fought together, the other being Operation Cowboy.

== Promotions ==
- 1 November 1928 Kanonier (Artillery Gunner)
- 1 November 1930 Oberkanonier (Senior Artillery Gunner)
- 1 November 1932 Gefreiter (Private E-2/Lance Corporal)
- 1 November 1934 Obergefreiter (Private First Class E-3/Senior Lance Corporal)
- 1 December 1934 Unteroffizier (NCO/Corporal/Junior Sergeant)
- 1 October 1936 Wachtmeister (Staff Sergeant)
- 1 December 1938 Oberwachtmeister (Sergeant Major/Senior Staff Sergeant)
- 30 June 1940 Leutnant/Kr.O. (2nd Lieutenant/War Officer) with Rank Seniority (RDA) from 1 May 1935 (27)
- 18 January 1942 Oberleutnant/Kr.O. (1st Lieutenant/War Officer) with Rank Seniority (RDA) from 1 November 1941 (983)
  - 1 October 1942 transferred to the active officer corps
- 20 April 1944 Hauptmann (Captain) with Rank Seniority (RDA) from 1 February 1943 (256)
- March/April 1945 Major

== Awards, decorations and honors ==
- German Reich Sport Badge (Deutsches Reichssportabzeichen) in Bronze
- Wehrmacht Long Service Award, 4th Class on 2 October 1936
- Iron Cross (1939), 2nd and 1st Class
  - 2nd Class on 25 September 1941
  - 1st Class on 12 February 1942
- Winter Battle in the East 1941–42 Medal on 20 July 1942
- German Cross in Gold on 8 March 1945 as Hauptmann and Commander of the II. Battalion/Rocket Artillery Regiment 83

=== Posthumous honors ===
Gangl was posthumously honoured as a hero of the Austrian resistance. A street in Wörgl is named after him. Additionally, a small memorial was crafted in his honor with an engraving on it, detailing Gangl's joining of the local resistance and freeing of the captives kept at Castle Itter. He is referred to as "Sepp Gangl" on this memorial, and it states that he "died a hero's death at 35 years of age."

In October 2021, a commemorative plaque in his honor was affixed at the Bundeswehr Karlskaserne in Ludwigsburg—where he himself once served.

== In popular culture ==
A song by the Swedish metal band Sabaton, "The Last Battle", is about the fight in the Tyrolean Alps.

== Literature ==
- Stephen Harding, The Last Battle: When US and German Soldiers Joined Forces in the Waning Hours of World War II in Europe. Da Capo Press, Boston (Massachusetts) 2013. ISBN 978-0-306-82209-4
- Martin Eich: Er riskierte sein Leben und rettete einstige Feinde. Ende des Kriegs verbündete sich der deutsche Major Josef Gangl mit Amerikanern, um französische Gefangene vor SS-Truppen zu schützen. Frankfurter Allgemeine Zeitung of May 4, 2018, p. 6, No. 193.
