= Battle of Castle Itter =

1945 battle of World War II

- Part of the end of World War II in Europe and Austrian resistance in WW2
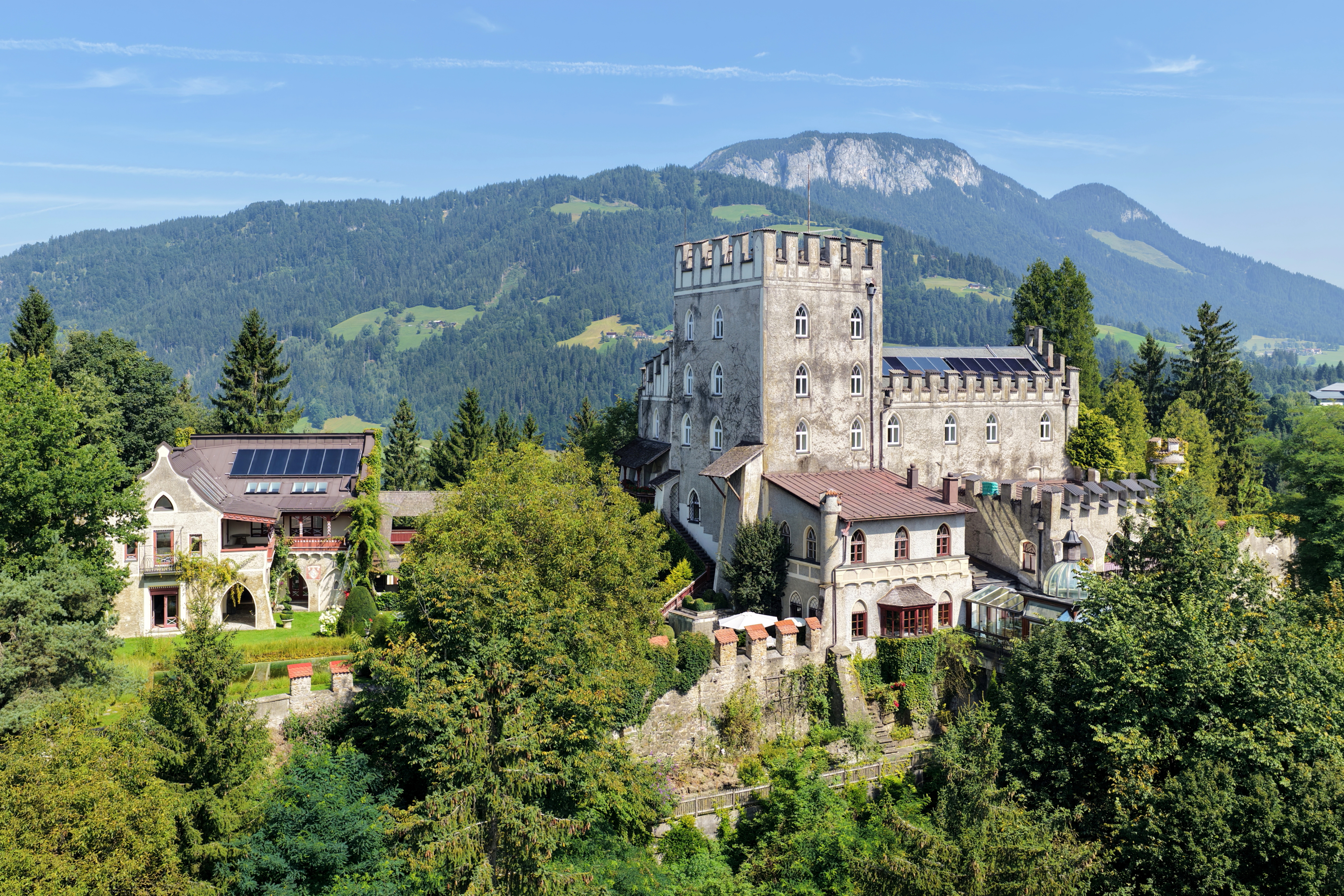
- Itter Castle in 2025
Date	5 May 1945
Location	Itter Castle, Tyrol, Austria 47°28′14″N 12°08′23″E
Result	Allied victory

Belligerents
(United States) United States; Austrian resistance	Waffen-SS

Commanders and leaders
John C. Lee Jr. Josef Gangl †; Kurt-Siegfried Schrader	Georg Bochmann (surrendered)

Units involved
12th Armored Division; 142nd Infantry Regiment	17th SS Panzergrenadier Division Götz von Berlichingen

Strength
36 personnel 4 tanks (1 engaged)	150–200 personnel 3 flak guns

Casualties and losses
1 killed and 4 wounded 1 tank M4A3E8 destroyed	Many killed and wounded 100 captured
- Location within Austria

The Battle of Castle Itter was fought on 5 May 1945, in the Austrian village of Itter in the North Tyrol region of the country, during the last days of the European Theater of World War II.

Troops of the 23rd Tank Battalion of the 12th Armored Division of the US XXI Corps led by Lieutenant John C. "Jack" Lee Jr, a number of Wehrmacht soldiers led by Major Josef "Sepp" Gangl, SS-Hauptsturmführer Kurt-Siegfried Schrader, and recently freed French prisoners of war defended Castle Itter against an attacking force from the 17th SS Panzergrenadier Division until relief from the American 142nd Infantry Regiment of the 36th Division of XXI Corps arrived.

The battle is one of two known times during the war in which Americans and Germans fought side by side, the other being Operation Cowboy, and the only known time where an active member of the Waffen-SS fought on the Allied side. Popular accounts have called it the strangest battle of World War II.

== Background ==
Itter Castle is a small castle on a hill near the village of Itter in Austria. After the 1938 Anschluss, the German government officially leased the castle in late 1940 from its owner, Franz Grüner.

The castle was seized from Grüner by SS Lieutenant General Oswald Pohl under the orders of Heinrich Himmler on 7 February 1943. The transformation of the castle into a prison was completed by 25 April 1943, and the facility was placed under the administration of the Dachau concentration camp.

The prison was established to contain high-profile French prisoners valuable to the Reich. Notable prisoners included tennis player Jean Borotra, former prime ministers Édouard Daladier and Paul Reynaud, former commanders-in-chief Maxime Weygand and Maurice Gamelin, Charles de Gaulle’s elder sister Marie-Agnès de Gaulle, right-wing leader and French resistance member François de La Rocque, and trade union leader Léon Jouhaux. Besides the VIP prisoners, the castle held a number of Eastern European prisoners detached from Dachau, who were used for maintenance and other menial work.

== Prelude ==
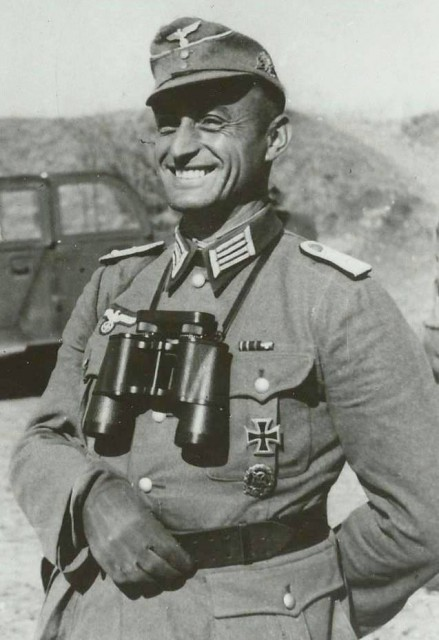
Major Josef Gangl

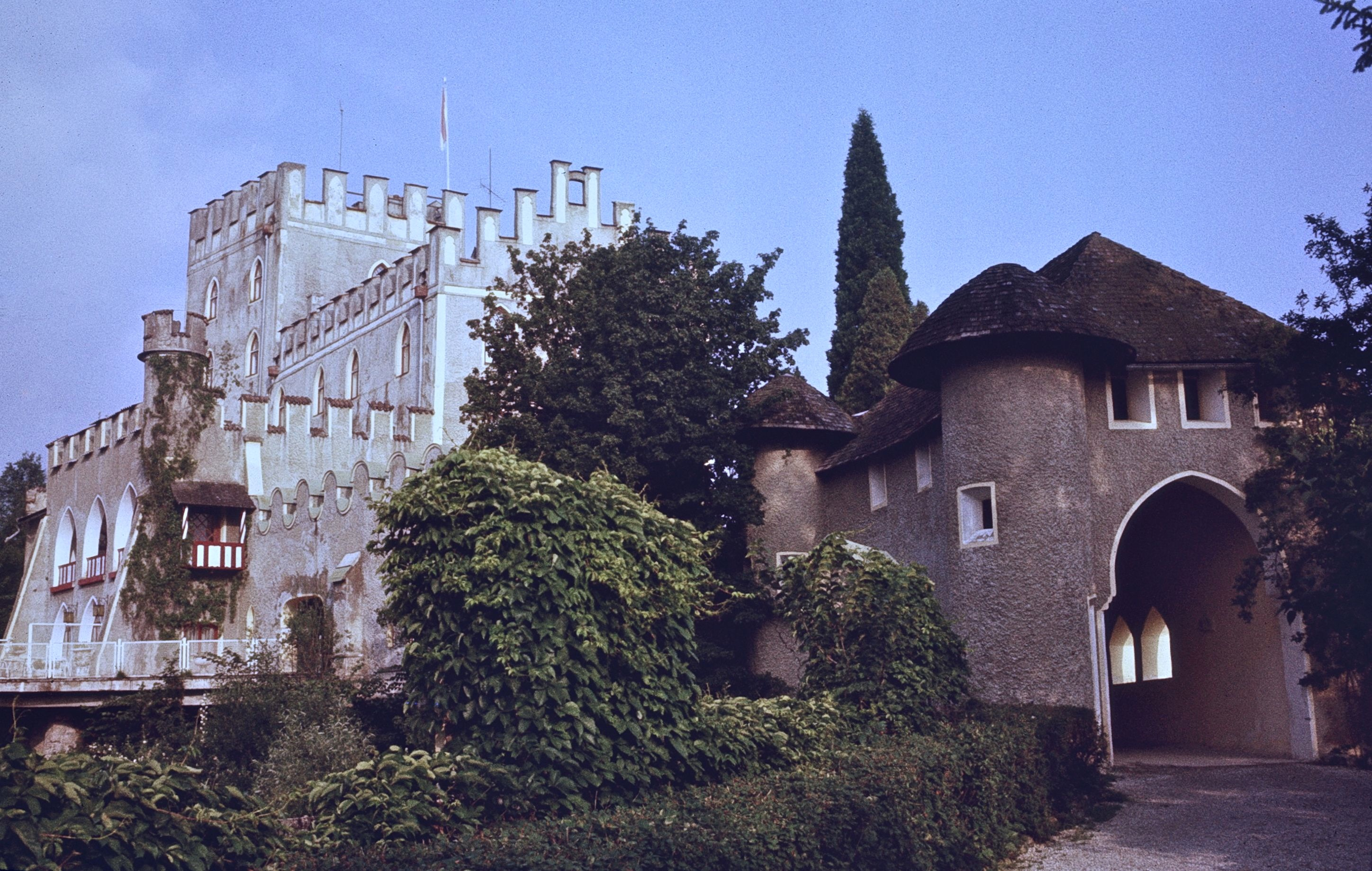
The main entrance to the castle (1979)

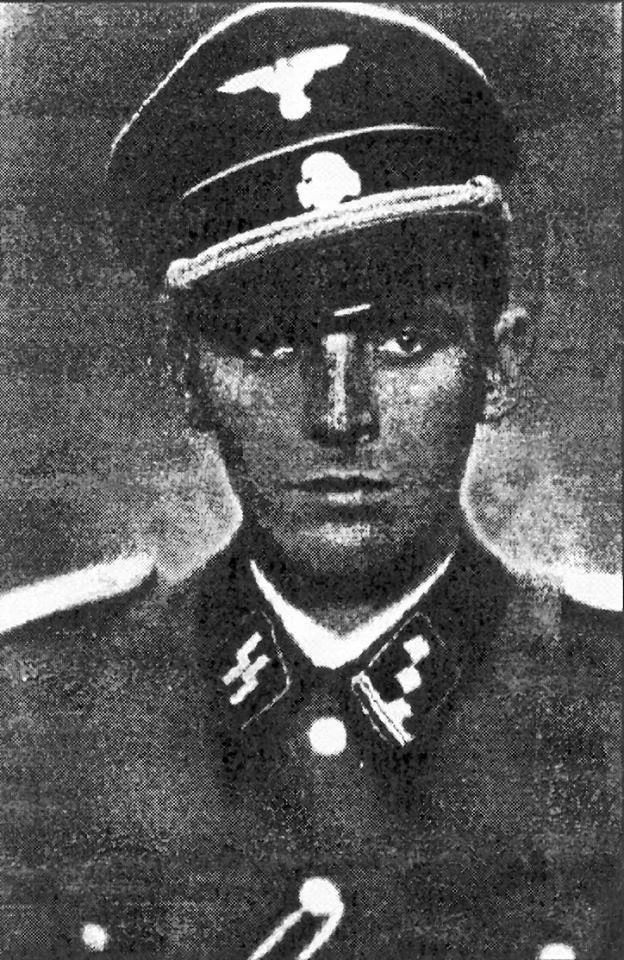
Kurt-Siegfried Schrader

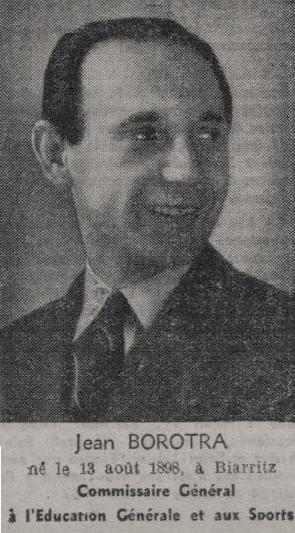
French tennis star Jean Borotra in 1942

On 3 May 1945, Zvonimir Čučković, an imprisoned Yugoslav communist resistance member from Croatia who worked as a handyman at the prison, left the castle under the pretext of performing an errand for the prison's commander Sebastian Wimmer. Čučković went to seek Allied assistance.

The town of Wörgl was 8 kilometres (5 miles) down the mountains and was occupied by German troops; because of this, Čučković instead pressed on up the Inn River valley towards Innsbruck 64 km (40 mi) distant. Late that evening, he reached the outskirts of the city and encountered an advance party of the 409th Infantry Regiment of the American 103rd Infantry Division of the US VI Corps and informed them of the castle's prisoners.

At dawn, a heavily armored rescue was mounted, but was stopped by heavy shelling just past Jenbach, around halfway to Itter, then recalled by superiors for encroaching into territory of the U.S. 36th Division to the east. Only two jeeps of auxiliary personnel continued. When Čučković failed to return, and the former commandant of Dachau Eduard Weiter died in suspicious circumstances at the castle on 2 May, Wimmer feared for his own life and abandoned his post. The SS-Totenkopfverbände guards left the castle soon after, and the prisoners took control of the castle and armed themselves with the weapons that remained; however, they feared an attack by any roaming parties of SS men still loyal to the Nazi regime.

Failing to learn of the result of Čučković's effort, prison leaders accepted the offer of its Czech cook, Andreas Krobot, to bicycle to Wörgl mid-day on 4 May in hopes of reaching help there. Armed with a similar note, he succeeded in contacting Austrian resistance in Wörgl, which had recently been abandoned by Wehrmacht forces but reoccupied by roaming Waffen-SS troops. He was taken to Major Josef Gangl, commander of the remains of a unit of Wehrmacht soldiers who had defied an order to retreat and instead thrown in with the local resistance, led by Rupert Hagleitner.

Gangl sought to maintain his unit's position in the town to protect local residents from SS reprisals. Nazi loyalists would shoot at any window displaying either a white flag or an Austrian flag, and would summarily execute males as possible deserters. Gangl's hopes were pinned on the Americans reaching Wörgl promptly so he could surrender to them. Instead, he would now have to approach them under a white flag to ask for their help.

Around the same time, a reconnaissance unit of four Sherman tanks of the 23rd Tank Battalion, 12th Armored Division of the US XXI Corps, under the command of Lieutenant Lee, had reached Kufstein, Austria, 13 km (8 mi) to the north. There, in the town square, it idled while waiting for the 12th to be relieved by the 36th Infantry Division. Asked to provide relief by Gangl, Lee did not hesitate, volunteering to lead the rescue mission and immediately earning permission from his HQ.

After a personal reconnaissance of the Castle with Gangl and Hagleitner, in the major's Kübelwagen, Lee left two of his tanks behind but requisitioned five more and supporting infantry from the recently arrived 142nd Infantry Regiment of the 36th.

En route, Lee was forced to send the reinforcements back when a bridge proved too flimsy for the entire group to cross once, let alone twice. Leaving one of his tanks behind to guard it, he set back off accompanied only by 14 American soldiers, Gangl, a driver, and a truck carrying ten former German artillerymen. 6 km (4 mi) from the castle, they defeated a party of SS troops that had been attempting to set up a roadblock.

Meanwhile, the French prisoners had asked an SS officer, Kurt-Siegfried Schrader, whom they had befriended in Itter during his convalescence from wounds and who was living locally, to take charge of their defense. Schrader would also situate his family within the castle to protect them as well as the French POWs. When Lee arrived at the castle, prisoners greeted the rescuing force warmly but were disappointed with its small size. Lee placed the men under his command in defensive positions around the castle and positioned his Sherman tank, Besotten Jenny, at the main entrance.

== Battle ==
Shortly after the arrival of the reinforcements, a force of 100–150 Waffen-SS soldiers led by Oberführer Georg Bochmann, who had been occupying some hills near the town, decided to attack the castle. Lee had ordered the French prisoners to hide, but they remained outside and fought alongside the American and Wehrmacht soldiers. Throughout the night, the defenders were harried by a reconnaissance force sent to assess their strength and probe the fortress for weaknesses. Before the main assault began, Gangl was able to phone Alois Mayr, the Austrian resistance leader in Wörgl, and ask for reinforcements. Only two more German soldiers under his command and a teenage Austrian resistance member, Hans Waltl, could be spared, and they quickly drove to the castle.

In the morning of 5 May, the attack began. The castle shook from machine gun fire and anti-aircraft shells to such an extent that some bricks began to collapse, one hitting and injuring Schrader's wife. The Sherman tank provided machine gun fire support until it was destroyed by SS fire from an 88 mm gun; it was occupied at the time only by a radioman seeking to repair the tank's faulty radio, who escaped without injury.

Meanwhile, by early afternoon, word had finally reached the 142nd of the desperation of the defenders' plight, and a relief force was dispatched. Aware that he had been unable to give the 142nd complete information on the enemy and its disposition before communications had been severed, Lee accepted tennis star Borotra's offer to vault the castle wall and run the gauntlet of SS strong points and ambushes to deliver it. The tennis star was recognized by René Lévesque, a French Canadian reporter embedded with the 142nd and later Premier of Quebec. Borotra asked for an American military uniform, then joined the force as it made haste to reach the prison before its defenders fired their last rounds of ammunition.

The relief force arrived around 16:00, and the SS were promptly defeated. Some 100 SS prisoners were reportedly taken. The French prisoners were evacuated to France that evening, reaching Paris on 10 May.

== Aftermath and historical significance ==
For his service defending the castle, Lee was promoted to captain and received the Distinguished Service Cross. He died in 1973.

Gangl died during the battle from a 7.92×57mm Mauser round while trying to move former French Prime Minister Paul Reynaud out of harm's way, and was honored as an Austrian national hero; a street in Wörgl was named after him. He was the sole defender to die during the battle, though four others were wounded. Popular accounts of the battle have dubbed it the strangest battle of World War II. The battle was fought five days after Adolf Hitler had committed suicide and only two days before the signing of Germany's unconditional surrender.

Kurt-Siegfried Schrader received a two-year sentence after he was arrested and charged by US forces for his former affiliation with the Nazi party. His sentence was shortened in respect to his efforts at Itter. Schrader was released and in 1953 took a job as a civil servant in the Ministry of the Interior of the state of Westphalia. He died in the mid 1990s.

== In popular culture ==
Swedish power metal band Sabaton released a song about the battle, titled "The Last Battle", on their 2016 album The Last Stand.

The US/Serbian WW2 action drama Battle for Castle Itter is based on this event. Production began on 15 February until 7 March 2024. It was released on 30 May 2025.

Issue 5 of the Mad Cave comic book series Dog Tag, written by Mark Russell with art by PJ Holden and JP Jordan, portrays the battle. It was released in September 2026.
