= Marie-Agnès Cailliau =

French resistance fighter, sister of Charles de Gaulle (1889–1982)

Marie-Agnès de Cailliau
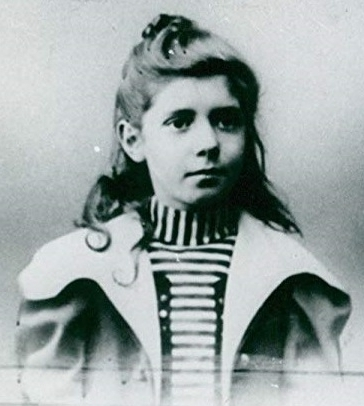
- de Gaulle around 1899
- Born: 27 May 1889; Paris, France (6th arrondissement)
- Died: 25 March 1982 (aged 92); Boulogne-Billancourt
- Citizenship: French
- Movement: French Resistance
- Spouse: Albert Cailliau
- Children: Joseph Cailliau, Marie-Thérèse Cailliau, Michel Cailliau, Henri Cailliau, Charles Cailliau, Pierre Cailliau, Denys Cailliau
- Parents: Henri de Gaulle (father); Jeanne Maillot (mother)
- Family: Charles de Gaulle

Marie-Agnès Cailliau (born Marie-Agnès Caroline Julie de Gaulle, 1889–1982) was a French Resistance fighter and the older sister of Charles de Gaulle.

== Biography ==
Cailliau was born on May 27, 1889, in the 6th arrondissement of Paris and died on March 25, 1982, in Boulogne-Billancourt. She married Belgian engineer Alfred Cailliau in 1910.

=== Resistance ===
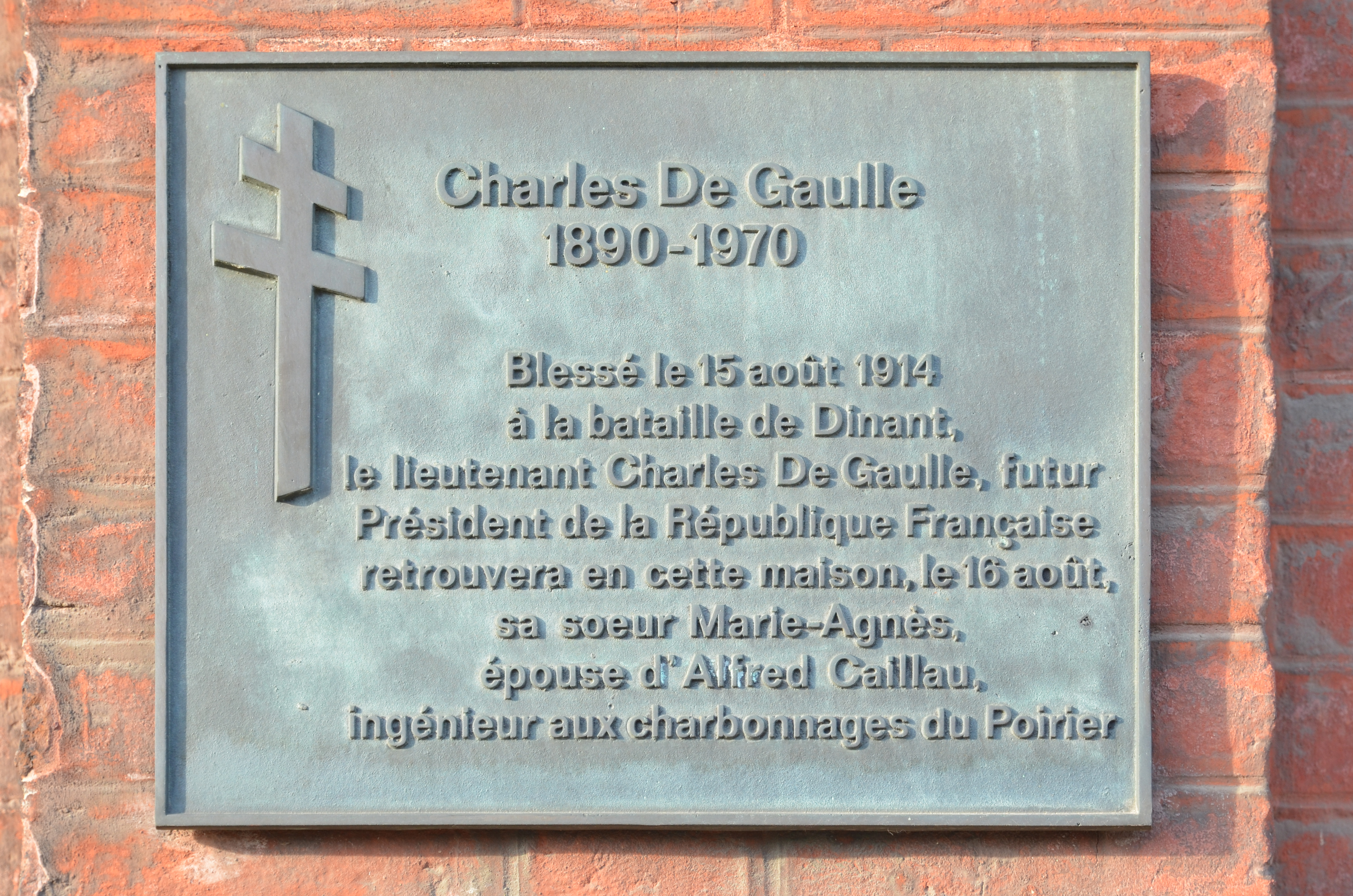
Commemorative plaque of Charles de Gaulle’s visit to his sister in Charleroi on August 16, 1914. " Charles De Gaulle 1890–1970 Wounded on August 15, 1914, at the Battle of Dinant, Lieutenant Charles De Gaulle, future President of the French Republic, found refuge in this house on August 16, with his sister Marie-Agnès, wife of Alfred Caillau, engineer at the Poirier coal mines."

During the First World War, she was responsible for evacuating her brother, then Lieutenant de Gaulle, who was wounded in Dinant on August 15, 1914, while leading an assault on enemy trenches.

During World War II, she responded to her brother’s Appeal of 18 June, by quickly joining the French Resistance. Marie-Agnès Cailliau was arrested along with her husband in 1943 and imprisoned for fourteen months at Fresnes Prison before being moved to Bad Godesberg, an annex (an addition of a camp) of the Buchenwald concentration camp where her husband was also held. At that time, four members of the de Gaulle family were in German hands, and as defeat loomed, Heinrich Himmler even proposed an exchange to de Gaulle, which the latter ignored.

Towards the end of the war, in April 1945, Marie-Agnès Cailliau was transferred to Itter Castle in Tyrol under detention conditions that were incomparably better than those in the camps. There, since 1943, several high-profile French figures had also been held, including Paul Reynaud, Édouard Daladier, Generals Maxime Weygand and Maurice Gamelin, Jean Borotra, and Colonel François de La Rocque. They were liberated by American troops on May 5, 1945 in the Battle of Castle Itter.

=== Private Life ===
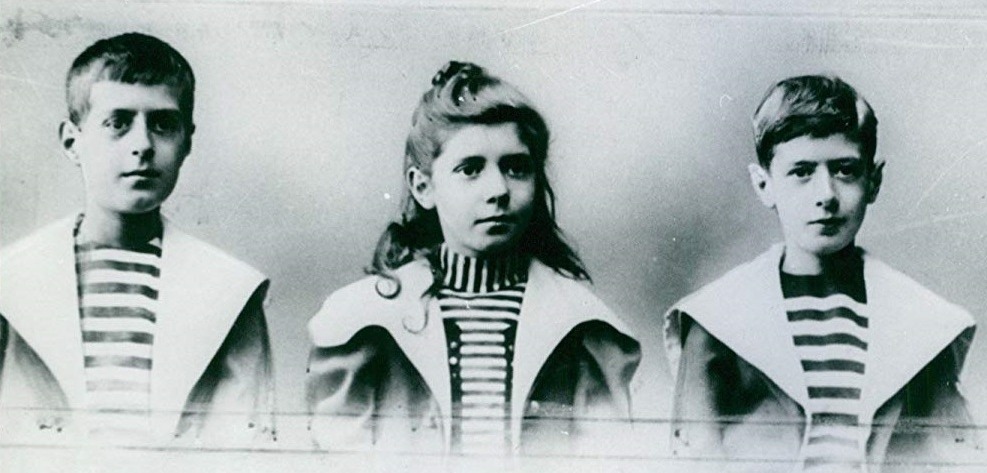
The first three (out of five) of the de Gaulle siblings, Xavier, Marie-Agnès, and Charles, around 1899.

On January 18, 1910, Marie-Agnès Caroline Julie de Gaulle married Alfred Cailliau in Paris (born August 7, 1877, in Tournai and died in 1967), a Belgian engineer. With her husband, they had seven children: Joseph in 1910, Marie-Thérèse in 1912, Michel in 1913, Henri in 1915, Charles in 1916, Pierre in 1921, and finally Denys in 1929.

Marie-Agnès Cailliau lost one of her sons, Charles (1916–1940), who fell on the front during the French campaign. Two others, her eldest Henri (born in 1915) and Pierre, joined the Free French Forces, while the fourth, Michel Cailliau, who had been a prisoner of war and escaped in 1942, went on to create a resistance network. In 1970, she wrote a memoir about her family, mainly intended for her children and grandchildren.

=== Burial ===
She is buried with her parents in the Sainte-Adresse (Seine-Maritime). Ending her life on March 25, 1982 at her retirement home in Boulogne-Billancourt. However, the exact date of her burial is unknown.

== Publication ==
- Souvenirs personnels, Marie-Agnès Cailliau de Gaulle, préf. Jean Lacouture, éditions Parole et Silence, rééd. 2006 ISBN 2-84573-516-2.
