= Georg Bochmann =

Oberführer in the Waffen-SS (1913–1973)

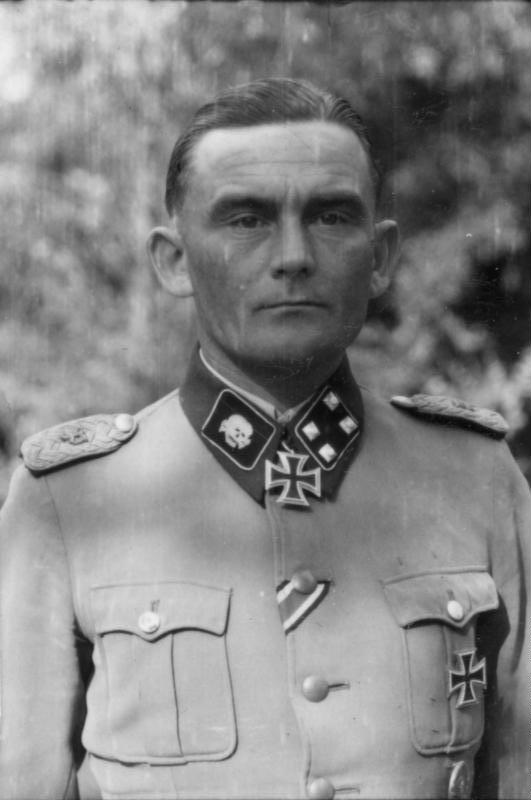
- Georg Bochmann, as an SS-Sturmbannführer
- Born: 18 September 1913; Albernau, Saxony, Germany
- Died: 8 June 1973 (aged 59); Offenbach am Main, Hesse, West Germany
- Military career
- Allegiance: Nazi Germany
- Branch: SS-Totenkopfverbände; Waffen-SS
- Service years: 1934–1945
- Rank: SS-Oberführer
- Service number: NSDAP #1,907,565; SS #122,362
- Commands: SS Division Götz von Berlichingen; SS Division Horst Wessel
- Conflicts: World War II: Battle of France; Battle of Arras (1940); Operation Barbarossa; Demyansk Pocket; Third Battle of Kharkov; Battle of Kursk; Battle of Castle Itter (surrendered)
- Awards: Knight's Cross of the Iron Cross with Oak Leaves and Swords

Georg Bochmann (18 September 1913 – 8 June 1973) was a high-ranking commander and Oberführer in the Waffen-SS who commanded the SS Division Götz von Berlichingen and the SS Division Horst Wessel. He was a recipient of the Knight's Cross of the Iron Cross with Oak Leaves and Swords.

== Early career ==
Bochmann was born in Albernau, in Saxony on the border with Bohemia. His family were textile workers of modest means. He studied at the University of Leipzig. After joining the Hitler Youth, Bochmann joined the Nazi Party in 1933 (Membership Number: 1,907,565) and the SS the following year (Membership Number: 122,362), working at the Dachau concentration camp. In 1936, he was appointed to the "SS-Totenkopf Standarte Oberbayern".

== World War II ==
In November 1939 he was appointed SS-Obersturmführer and "was a prime mover in the creation and outfitting of the SS Totenkopf Division, 1939-1940." In 1940, he assumed command of an armoured unit within the SS Division Totenkopf and during the French campaign the division fought at Cambrai, Arras, Dunkirk, and participated in deep thrusts into southwestern France. For his successes Bochmann received the Iron Cross, second class. A little later he was promoted to SS-Hauptsturmführer. The 3rd SS Division Totenkopf remained in France until April 1941 when it was transferred east to prepare for Operation Barbarossa.

On the eastern front the Totenkopf fought as part of the German Army Group North. Bochmann fought in the Baltic to Leningrad and was cited for his performances at Kaunas and Dünaburg in Latvia. In July 1941 Bochmann received the Iron Cross, first class, and in August 1941 the division reached Ilmen lake.

In January 1942 3rd SS Division Totenkopf was formally transferred to the German Second Army Corps and during the Soviet winter offensive there was a particularly savage battle at Demyansk. Nearly 100,000 German soldiers were surrounded for three months and were mostly supplied by Luftwaffe air drops. For his actions, Bochmann was awarded the Knight's Cross. A little after that he received the Demyansk Shield. On 2 April 1942 Bochmann was promoted to SS-Sturmbannführer (major).

On 21 October 1942 Bochmann was appointed commander of the 2nd Motorised Battalion of the Regiment "Thule" (within the 3rd SS Division Totenkopf). In late October the division was withdrawn to France for refitting. After returning to the eastern front, Bochmann assumed command of the 3rd Motorised Battalion and participated in the battles for Kharkov. He was awarded the Oak Leaves to Knight's Cross on 17 May 1943.

Later Bochmann was appointed to command the Panzer Regiment in the division; on 9 November 1943 he was promoted SS-Obersturmbannführer (lieutenant colonel). He commanded the "Totenkopf's" Panzer-Regiment through the Battle of Kursk and the subsequent battles along the Mius. Following fresh injuries he was withdrawn from the front and sent home. In Germany he was appointed head of SS Officer's School for Administration in Arolsen, Hesse. On 9 November 1944 he was promoted to SS-Standartenführer and transferred to 2nd SS Panzer Division Das Reich. However, after only a few weeks he was hastily transferred to command the 9th SS armored regiment in the 9th SS Panzer Division Hohenstaufen on 20 November.

Bochmann actually only returned to combat on 2 January 1945 when he was appointed commander of the 18th SS Volunteer Panzergrenadier Division Horst Wessel. After a brief stint fighting in the west, the division was moved to the eastern front, where it was decimated and quickly surrounded by the Red Army in Oberglogau, Silesia. Although wounded, Bochmann led a successful breakthrough and was awarded the Swords to the Knight's Cross (becoming the 140th recipient), Oak Leaves and the prestigious Wound Badge in Gold. Also he was promoted to SS-Oberführer on 20 April 1945.

With only a few weeks of the war left, Bochmann was appointed commander of the 17th SS Panzergrenadier Division Götz von Berlichingen. After retreating through Bavaria he refused suicidal orders from Generalfeldmarschall Ferdinand Schörner to attack Allied troops, was dismissed from his post and plans were started to court martial him.

He would then lead SS troops from the Berlichingen at the Battle of Castle Itter. In its aftermath, on 9 May 1945 Georg Bochmann surrendered to United States troops in the Rottach-Egern region.

Georg Bochmann died in 1973.

== Awards ==
- Iron Cross (1939) 2nd Class (20 June 1940) & 1st Class (8 July 1941)
- Knight's Cross of the Iron Cross with Oak Leaves and Swords
  - Knight's Cross on 3 May 1942 as SS-Hauptsturmführer and as leader of SS "Totenkopf"-Panzer-Jäger-Abteilung.
  - 246th Oak Leaves on 17 May 1943 as SS-Sturmbannführer and commander of the II./SS-Krad-Schützen-Regiment "Thule"
  - 140th Swords on 26 March 1945 as SS-Standartenführer and leader of the 18. SS-Freiwilligen-Panzergrenadier-Division "Horst Wessel"

Military offices
Preceded by SS-Gruppenführer Josef Fitzthum	Commander of 18th SS Volunteer Panzergrenadier Division Horst Wessel; 10 January 1945 – March 1945	Succeeded by SS-Standartenführer Heinrich Petersen
Preceded by SS-Standartenführer Jakob Fick	Commander of 17th SS Panzergrenadier Division Götz von Berlichingen; 27 March 1945 – 8 May 1945	Succeeded by disbanded
