= Josefine Brunner =

Austrian resistance fighter

- Born: 26 February 1909; Innsbruck, Tyrol, Austria-Hungary
- Died: 9 September 1943 (aged 34); Stadelheim Prison, Munich, Nazi Germany
- Cause of death: decapitation
- Occupations: socialist, resistance member and victim of the Nazi regime
- Years active: 1932–1943
- Spouse: Alois Brunner (m. 1938)

Josefine Brunner (née Ragnes, 26 February 1909 – 9 September 1943) was an Austrian socialist, resistance member and victim of the Nazi regime. Her code name was Erika.

== Family ==
Brunner was born on 26 February 1909 in Innsbruck, Tyrol, Austria to a working class family. After leaving school, she worked as a domestic servant. She lived with socialist Alois Brunner [de] from 1935, before they were married in 1938.

== Activism ==
In 1932, Brunner became a member of the Socialist Party of Austria (SPÖ). She was a member of Waldemar von Knoeringen's [de] resistance network against the Nazi Party, which was based in the town of Wörgl, before they annexed Austria. She completed special training in use of espionage techniques, including couriering. During the Anschluss (the German occupation of Austria), she couriered communication between illegal revolutionary socialist groups in Augsburg, Munich, Salzburg, Tyrol and Vienna, operating under the code name Erika.

Brunner and her husband were arrested in 1942 and were sentenced to death on 28 May 1943. She submitted a petition for clemency to Roland Freisler, President of the People's Court, after the verdict, but this was denied. On 9 September 1943, both Brunner and her husband were executed by decapitation at Stadelheim Prison in Munich, Nazi Germany, without being allowed to see each other before their deaths.

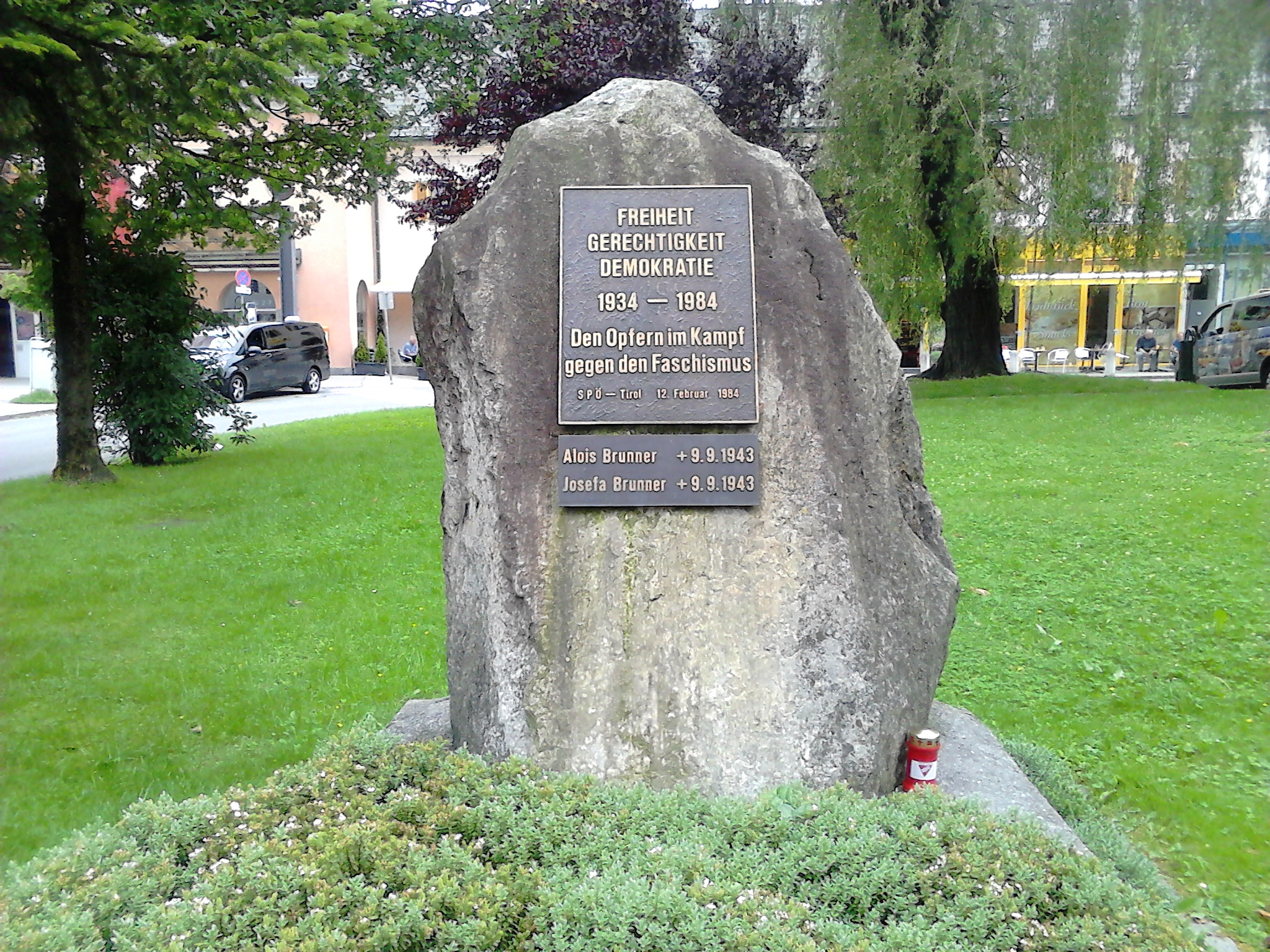
Memorial plaque to Alois and Josefine Brunner in Wörgl

== Legacy ==
In 1988, a commemorative plaque was erected at the train station square in Wörgl in honour of Brunner and her husband.

In 2015, Brunner and her husband were included on a plaque in the Wörgl town cemetery commemorating victims of Nazism.
