= Gisela Wurm =

Austrian politician (born 1957)

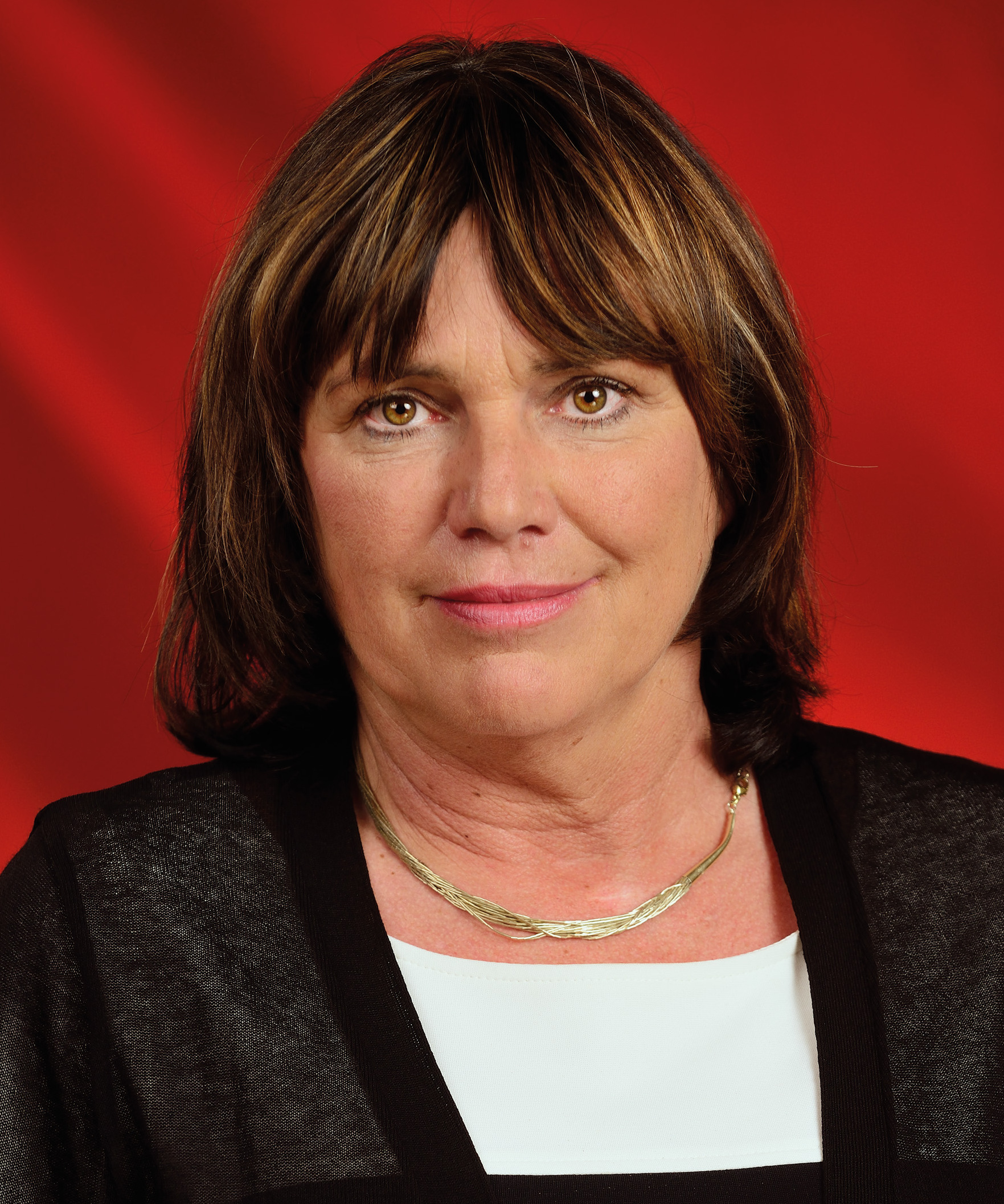
Gisela Wurm

Gisela Wurm (born 31 July 1957 in Wörgl) is an Austrian politician who has served as a member of the Austrian National Council from the Social Democratic Party of Austria from 1996 to 2017. In 2005, she was awarded the Decoration of Honour for Services to the Republic of Austria.
