= Léon Jouhaux =

French trade unionist and activist (1879 - 1954)

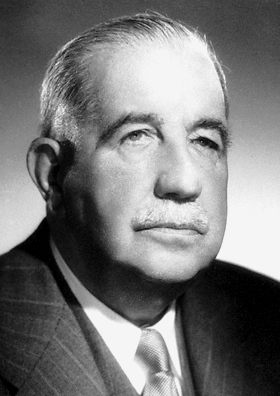
- Born: 1 July 1879; Pantin, France
- Died: 28 April 1954 (aged 74); Paris, France
- Resting place: Père Lachaise Cemetery
- Spouses: Catherine Metternich (married 1904-1946); Augustine Brüchlen (married 1946-)
- Father: Adolphe Jouhaux
- Awards: Nobel Peace Prize (1951); Legion of Honour

Léon Jouhaux (1 July 1879 – 28 April 1954) was a French trade union leader who received the Nobel Peace Prize in 1951.

== Biography ==
Jouhaux was born in Pantin, Seine-Saint-Denis, France. Jouhaux's father worked in a match factory in Aubervilliers. His secondary schooling ended when his father's earnings were stopped by a strike. He gained employment at the factory at age sixteen and immediately became an important part of the union. In 1900, after serving a brief mandatory military sentence in French Algeria, Jouhaux joined a strike against the use of the white phosphorus that blinded his father, was dismissed, and worked at a succession of jobs until union influence saw him reinstated.

In 1906, he was elected by the local union as a representative to the General Confederation of Labour (CGT), where his abilities saw him quickly rise through the ranks of organized labour. By 1909 he became interim treasurer, and shortly afterwards became secretary-general of the organization, which he held until 1947. His goals as a trade unionist were the familiar ones of the early labour movement — the eight-hour day, the right to union representation and collective bargaining, and paid holidays. During the Popular Front, the 1936 Matignon Agreement, to which he was a signatory, awarded many of these rights to French workers.

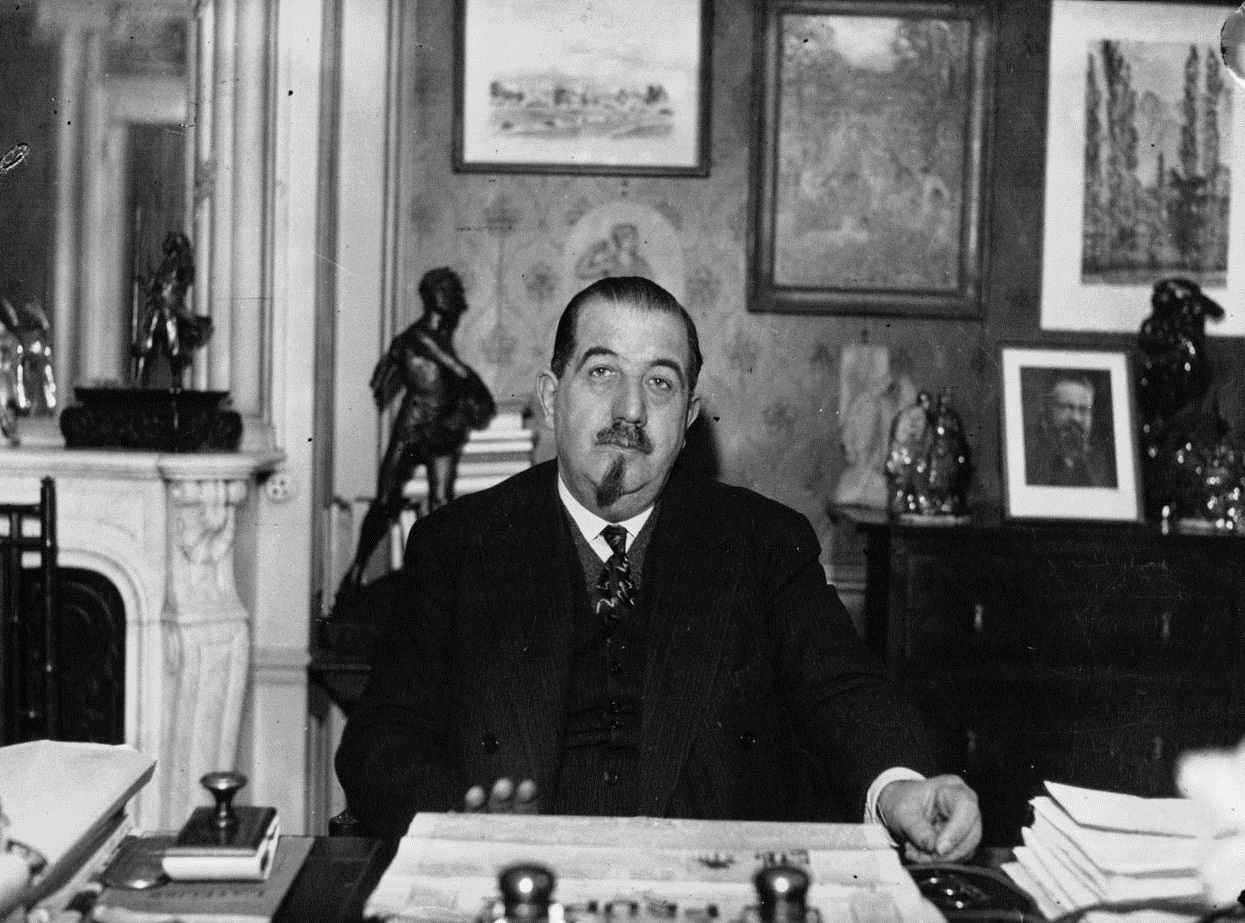
Jouhaux, c. 1933

In the years before World War II, Jouhaux organised several mass protests, and the organization he led protested against the war. However, once the war started, Jouhaux supported his country and believed that a Nazi Germany victory would lead to the destruction of democracy in Europe. During the war, he was arrested and imprisoned in Buchenwald concentration camp, later moved to the Castle Itter before being freed by American and German troops in the 1945 battle there.

After the war, Jouhaux split from the CGT to form the social-democrat Workers' Force (CGT-FO). In 1951, he was awarded the Nobel Peace Prize.

In an international context, his work was instrumental in the setting up of the International Labour Organization (ILO), and was elected to high positions in international trade union bodies, including the International Federation of Trade Unions and its postwar kin the World Federation of Trade Unions until that body split.

After his death in 1954, Léon Jouhaux was interred in Le Père Lachaise Cemetery in Paris.

== Legacy ==
- The rue Léon Jouhaux in Aix-en-Provence, Grenoble, Lyon, Genas, Villefranche-sur-Saône and Paris are named for him.

== Quotation ==
"I would not go so far as to say that the French trade unions attached greater importance to the struggle for peace than the others did; but they certainly seemed to take it more to heart." Léon Jouhaux
