= Itter =

- Municipality
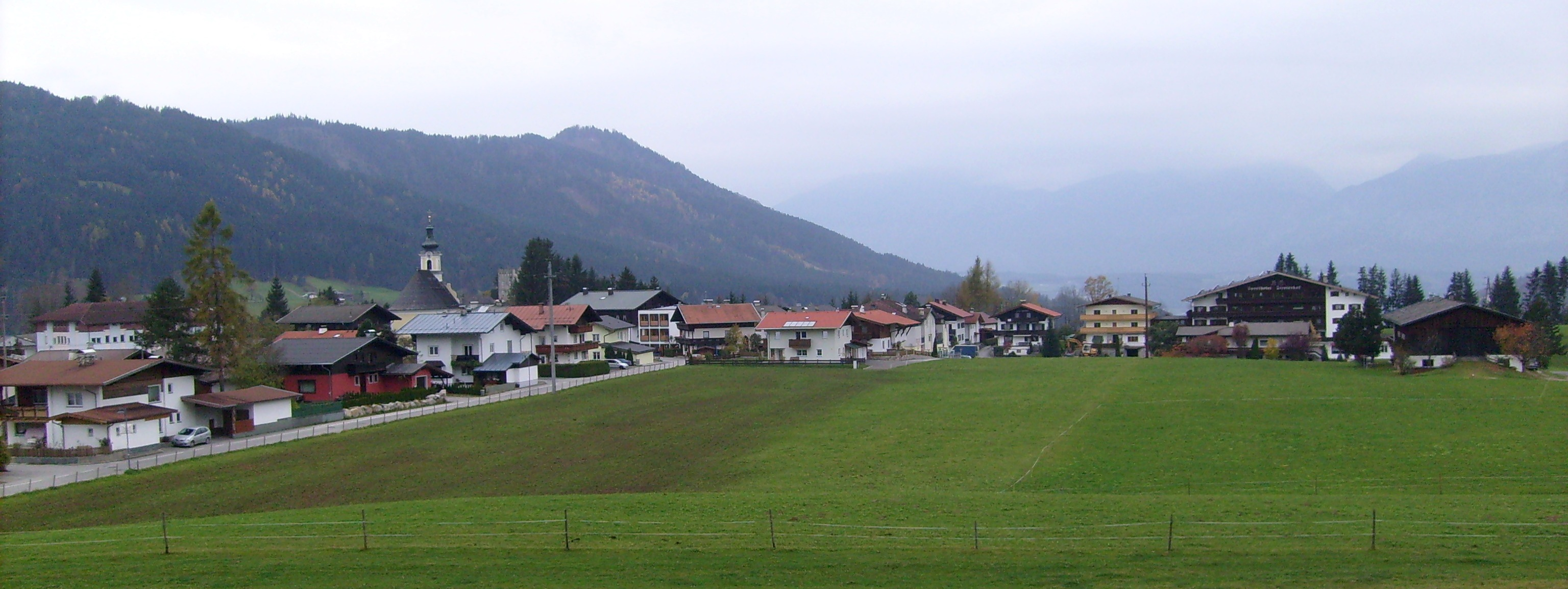

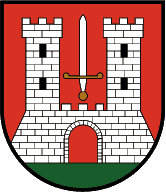
- Coat of arms

- Location within Austria
- Coordinates: 47°28′14″N 12°08′38″E
- Country: Austria
- State: Tyrol
- District: Kitzbühel

Government
  - Mayor: Johann Gratt

Area
  - Total: 10.44 km^{2} (4.03 sq mi)
- Elevation: 703 m (2,306 ft)

Population (2021)
  - Total: 1,173
  - Density: 112.4/km^{2} (291.0/sq mi)
- Time zone: UTC+1 (CET)
  - Summer (DST): UTC+2 (CEST)
- Postal code: 6305
- Area code: 05335
- Vehicle registration: KB
- Website: http://www.itter.tirol.gv.at

Itter [ˈɪtɐ] is a municipality in the Kitzbühel District in the Austrian state of Tyrol located 18.60 km west of Kitzbühel, 5 km southeast of Wörgl, and 2.5 km north of Hopfgarten im Brixental. The village lies on a terrace above the Brixental valley and its main source of income is tourism.

== Population ==
Historical population
Year	Pop.	±%
1869	499	—
1880	479	−4.0%
1890	424	−11.5%
1900	434	+2.4%
1910	447	+3.0%
1923	444	−0.7%
1934	480	+8.1%
1939	489	+1.9%
1951	587	+20.0%
1961	646	+10.1%
1971	792	+22.6%
1981	910	+14.9%
1991	980	+7.7%
2001	1,060	+8.2%
2011	1,180	+11.3%

== History ==
Itter is first mentioned in a deed dating back to 902 as „Uitaradorf“, when the hamlet was owned by the bishopric of Regensburg.

== Sights ==
The small castle of the village, Itter Castle, was a prison for French high personalities during World War II. Two days before the war ended, a battle was fought there against the Waffen-SS, one of two occasions when American and German forces fought on the same side during the war.
