= Wörgl =

- Municipality
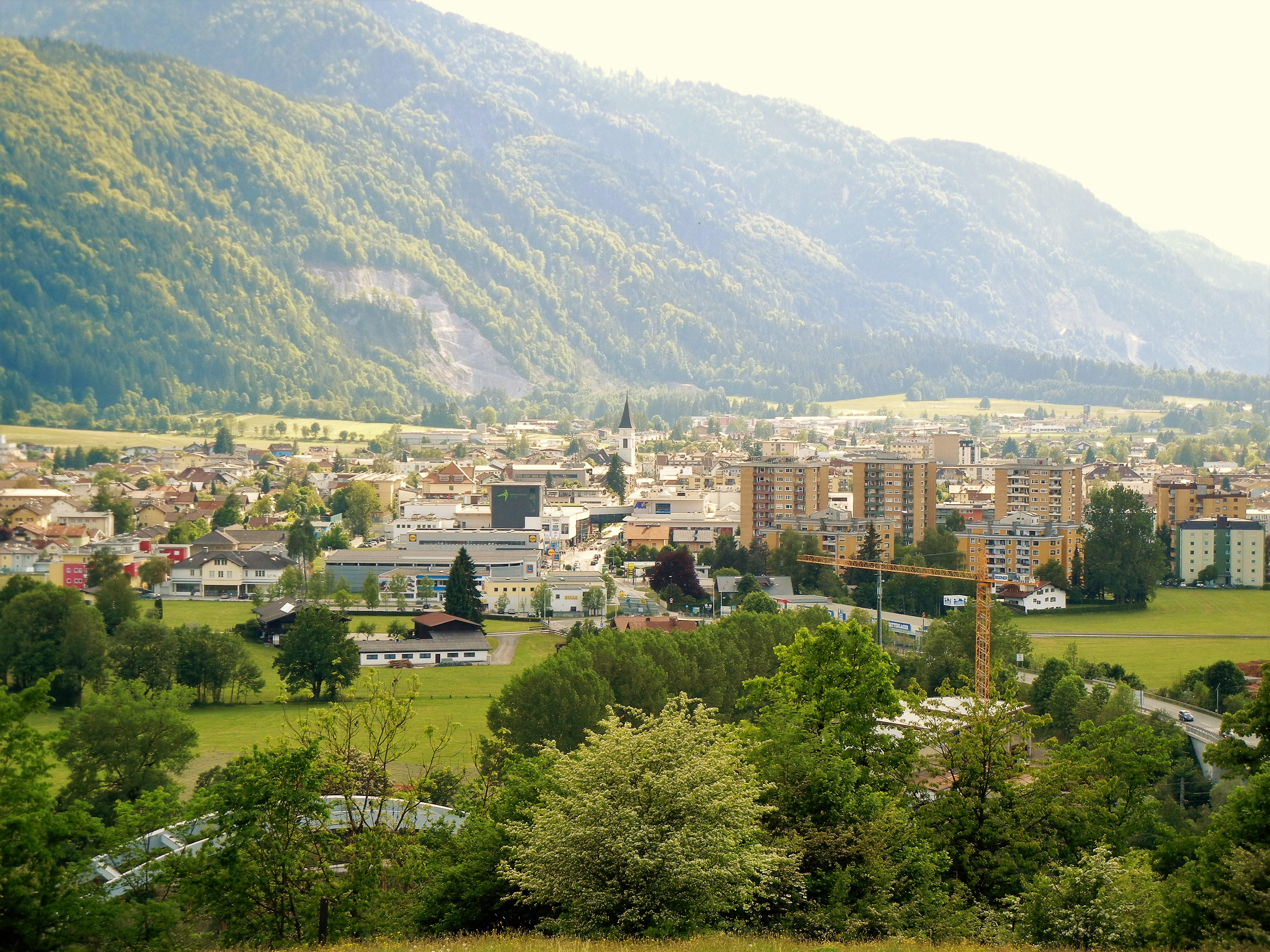
- Wörgl seen from the east (Grattenbergl)

- Coat of arms

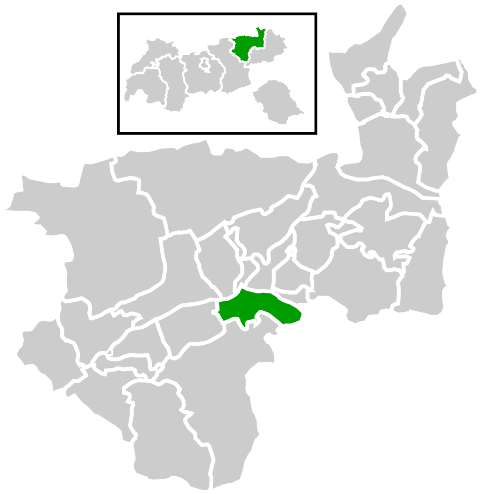
- Location within Kufstein district

- Location within Austria
- Coordinates: 47°29′N 12°04′E
- Country: Austria
- State: Tyrol
- District: Kufstein

Government
  - Mayor: Michael Riedhart

Area
  - Total: 19.74 km^{2} (7.62 sq mi)
- Elevation: 511 m (1,677 ft)

Population (2018-01-01)
  - Total: 13,811
  - Density: 699.6/km^{2} (1,812/sq mi)
- Time zone: UTC+1 (CET)
  - Summer (DST): UTC+2 (CEST)
- Postal code: 6300-6302
- Area code: 043-5332
- Vehicle registration: KU
- Website: www.woergl.at

Wörgl (German pronunciation: [ˈvœrɡəl]) is a city in the Austrian state of Tyrol, in the Kufstein district. It is 20 km (12 mi) from the international border with Bavaria, Germany.

It is known for the "Miracle of Wörgl" in the 1930s, a local currency experiment credited with reviving the local economy in an economic depression.

== Population ==
Historical population
Year	Pop.	±%
1869	1,080	—
1880	1,485	+37.5%
1890	2,319	+56.2%
1900	3,126	+34.8%
1910	4,232	+35.4%
1923	4,155	−1.8%
1934	4,196	+1.0%
1939	4,689	+11.7%
1951	6,247	+33.2%
1961	6,828	+9.3%
1971	7,937	+16.2%
1981	8,598	+8.3%
1991	10,041	+16.8%
2001	10,885	+8.4%
2011	12,645	+16.2%

== Transport ==
Wörgl is a railway junction on the line between Innsbruck and Munich, as well as the inner-Austrian line to Salzburg. Its railway station has been designated as a Hauptbahnhof (German: main station) since 10 December 2006.

European route E641 connects Wörgl with Salzburg. The E45 and E60 routes (Austrian autobahn A12) pass through Wörgl.

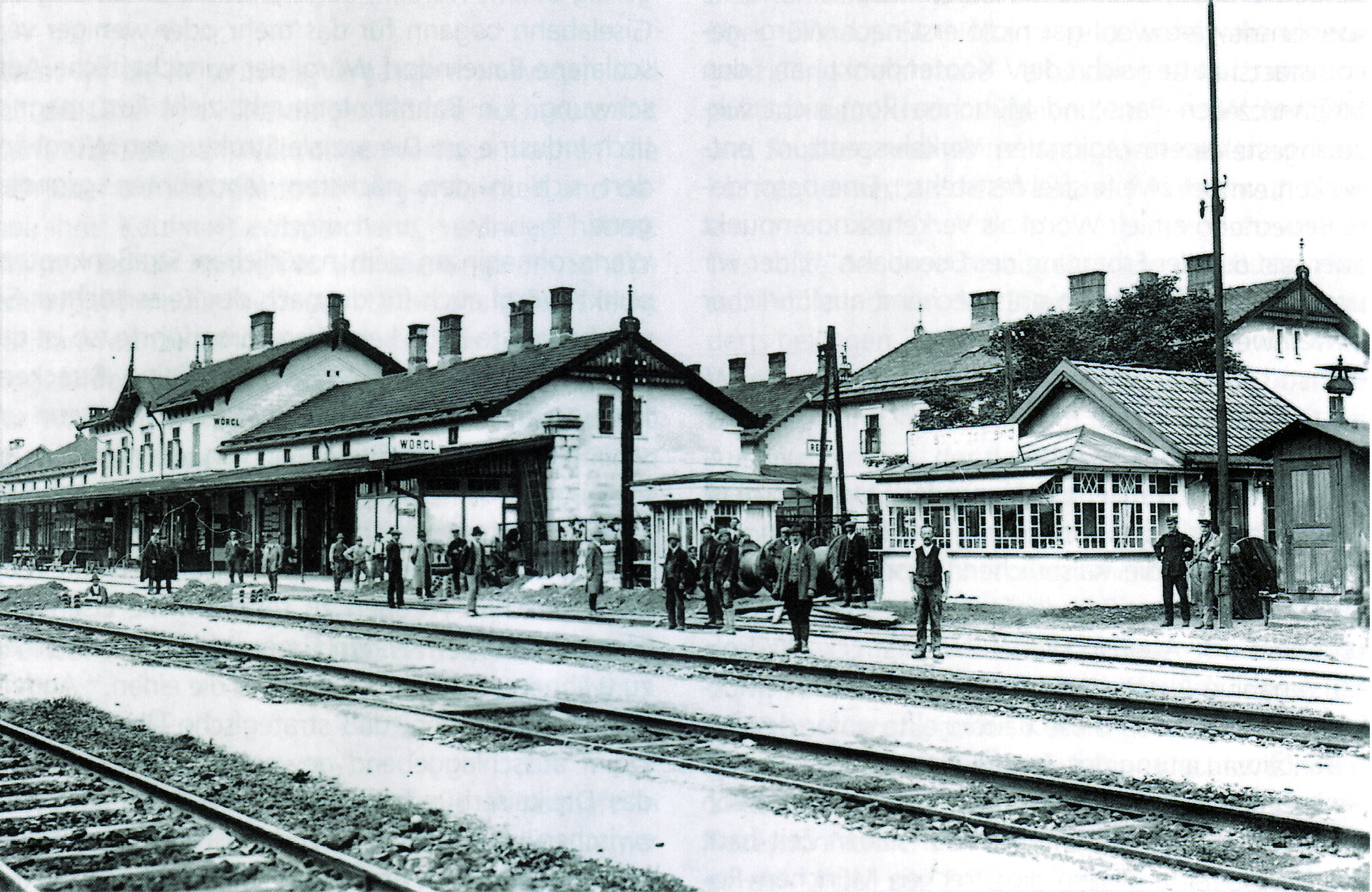
Wörgl railway station in 1900

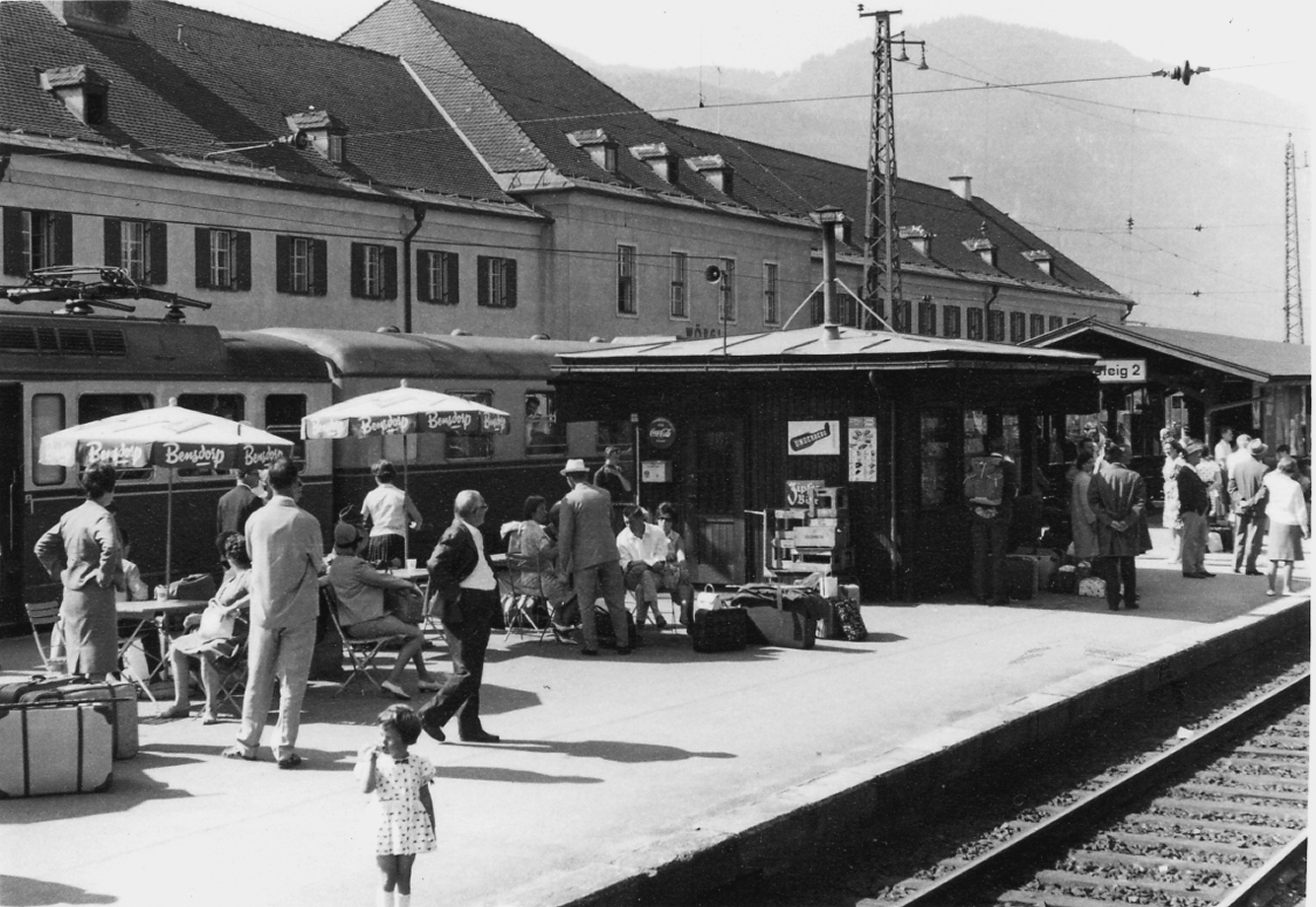
Wörgl railway station in 1965

== History ==
=== The Wörgl Experiment ===
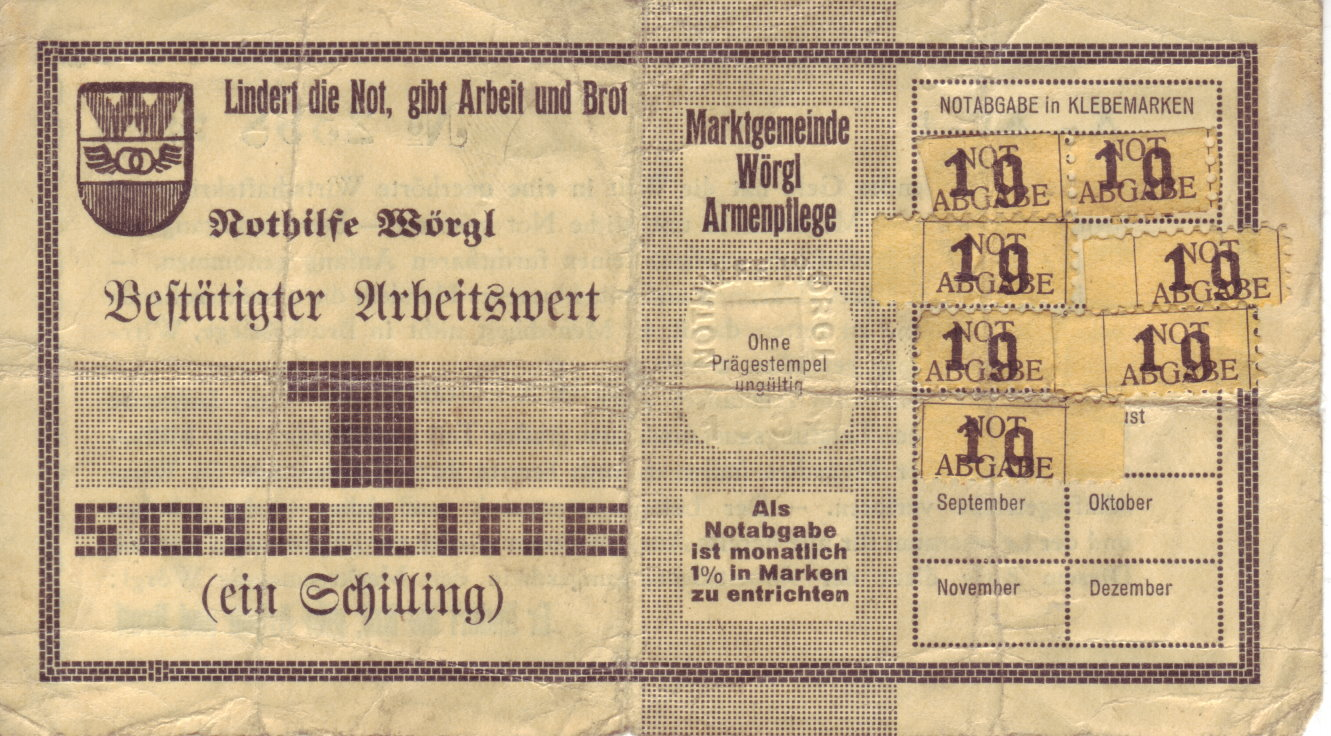
One Schilling note with demurrage stamps from Wörgl

Wörgl was the site of the "Miracle of Wörgl", beginning on 31 July 1932 during the Great Depression. Beginning with the issuing of "Certified Compensation Bills", a form of local currency commonly known as Stamp Scrip or Freigeld. This was an application of the monetary theories of the economist Silvio Gesell by the town's then-mayor, Michael Unterguggenberger.

The experiment resulted in a growth of employment and meant that local projects such as new houses, a reservoir, a ski jump and a bridge could all be completed, contrasting with high unemployment in the rest of Austria (although the extent of its long-term sustainability and effectiveness has been under question).

Despite attracting great interest at the time, including from French Premier Edouard Daladier and economist Irving Fisher, the "experiment" was ended by Austria's central bank Oesterreichische Nationalbank on 1 September 1933, so that the federal government would maintain a monopoly on the country's legal tender.

British economist John Maynard Keynes thought that "future economics will learn more from Gesell's ideas than from Marx's".

In 2006, milestones were placed across the town to commemorate this event.

=== World War II ===
The nearby Itter Castle (8 kilometres (5 miles) away from Wörgl) was the site of one of the last European battles of World War II. The castle had been seized from Grüner by SS Lieutenant General Oswald Pohl under the orders of Heinrich Himmler on 7 February 1943. The transformation of the castle into a prison was completed by 25 April 1943, and the facility was placed under the administration of the Dachau concentration camp.

The Battle for Itter Castle took place on 5 May 1945, with surrendered Wehrmacht troops, the United States Army, Austrian Resistance fighters and former French political prisoners fighting against the 17th Waffen-SS Panzer Grenadier Division. The leader of the surrendered Wehrmacht troops, Major Josef Gangl, was killed during the battle by a sniper and is buried in Wörgl's municipal cemetery. Sepp Gangl-Straße is a street in Wörgl named after Gangl.

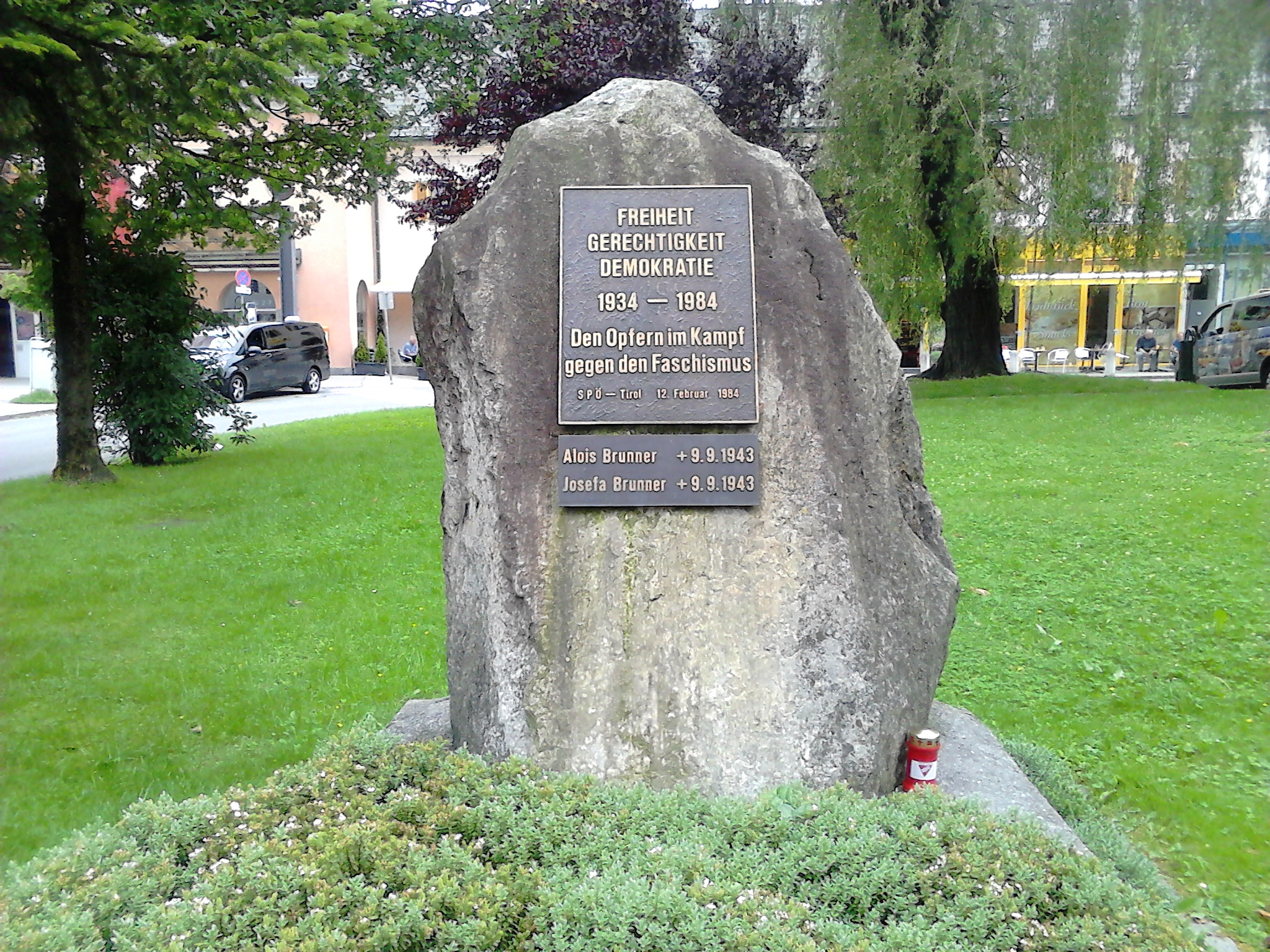
Memorial to Alois Brunner [de] and Josefine Brunner in Wörgl

Waldemar von Knoeringen's [de] resistance network against the Nazi Party was based in Wörgl. Commemoratives plaques and memorials have been established in the town, including to resistance member Josefine Brunner.

== Twin towns – sister cities ==
- Albrechtice nad Orlicí, Czech Republic
- Suwa, Japan

== Notable people ==
- Reinhard Furrer, German scientist.
- Gerhard Berger, Former Formula One racing driver and former co-owner of Scuderia Toro Rosso.
- Stefan Horngacher, Olympic ski jumper.
- Hans Peter Haselsteiner, Building tycoon and former deputy chair of the Liberal Forum.
- Richard Kitzbichler, Former Austria national football team player and assistant manager of Premier League side Southampton F.C.. Now at FC Bayern Munich.
- Hannes Staudinger, Austrian cinematographer.
- Gisela Wurm, Austrian politician.

== Gallery ==
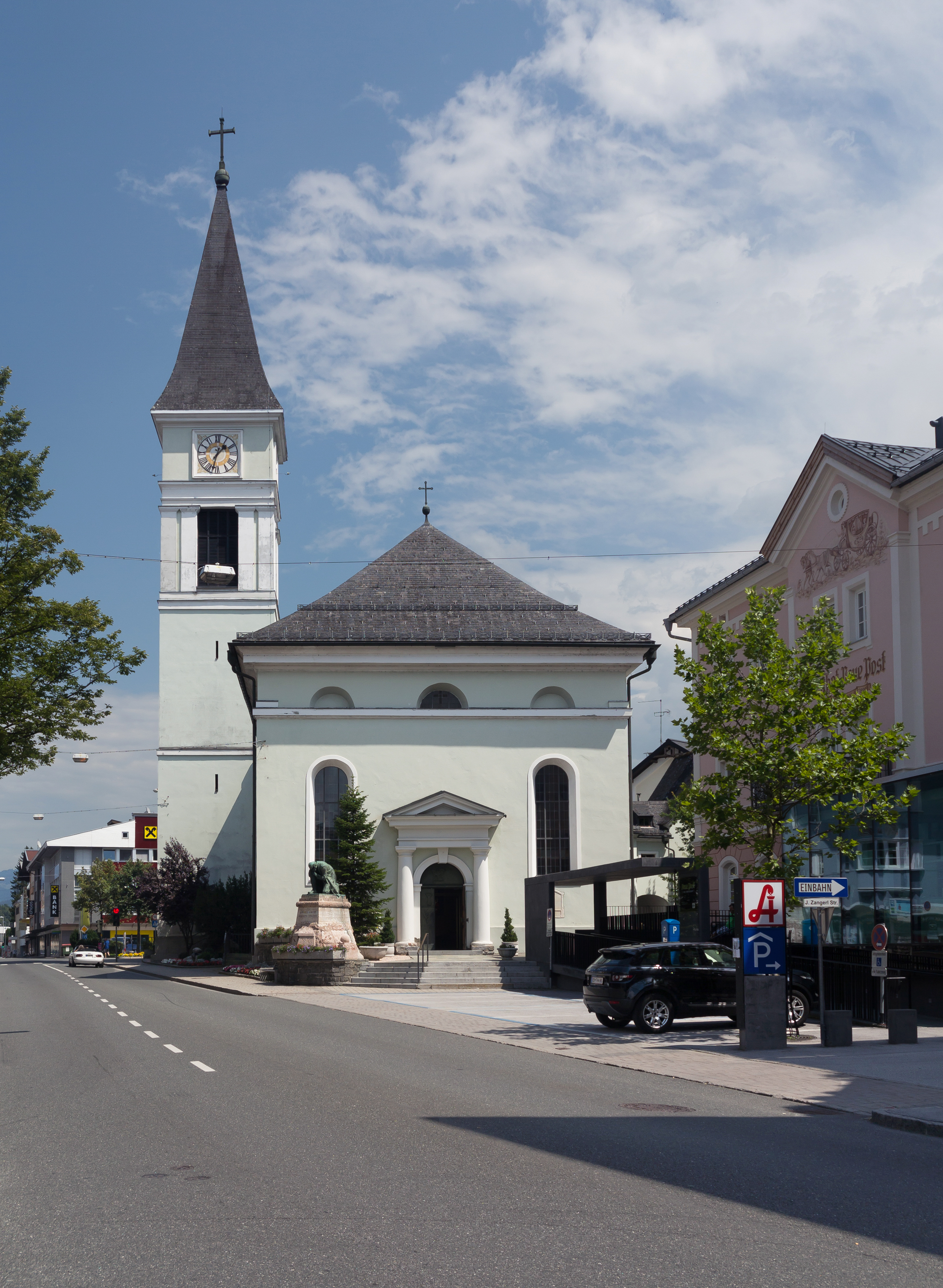
Pfarrkirche Wörgl church, located in Wörgl.

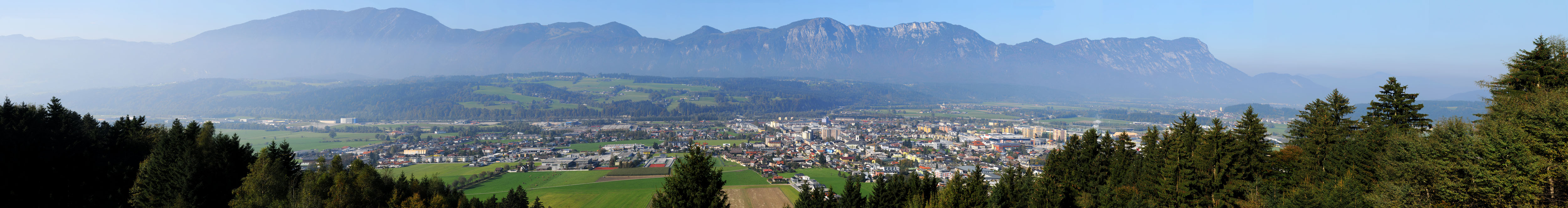
Panorama of Wörgl.

== See also ==
- Local currency
- Ithaca Hours
- Silvio Gesell
- Freigeld
