= Itter (Neckar) =

River in Germany

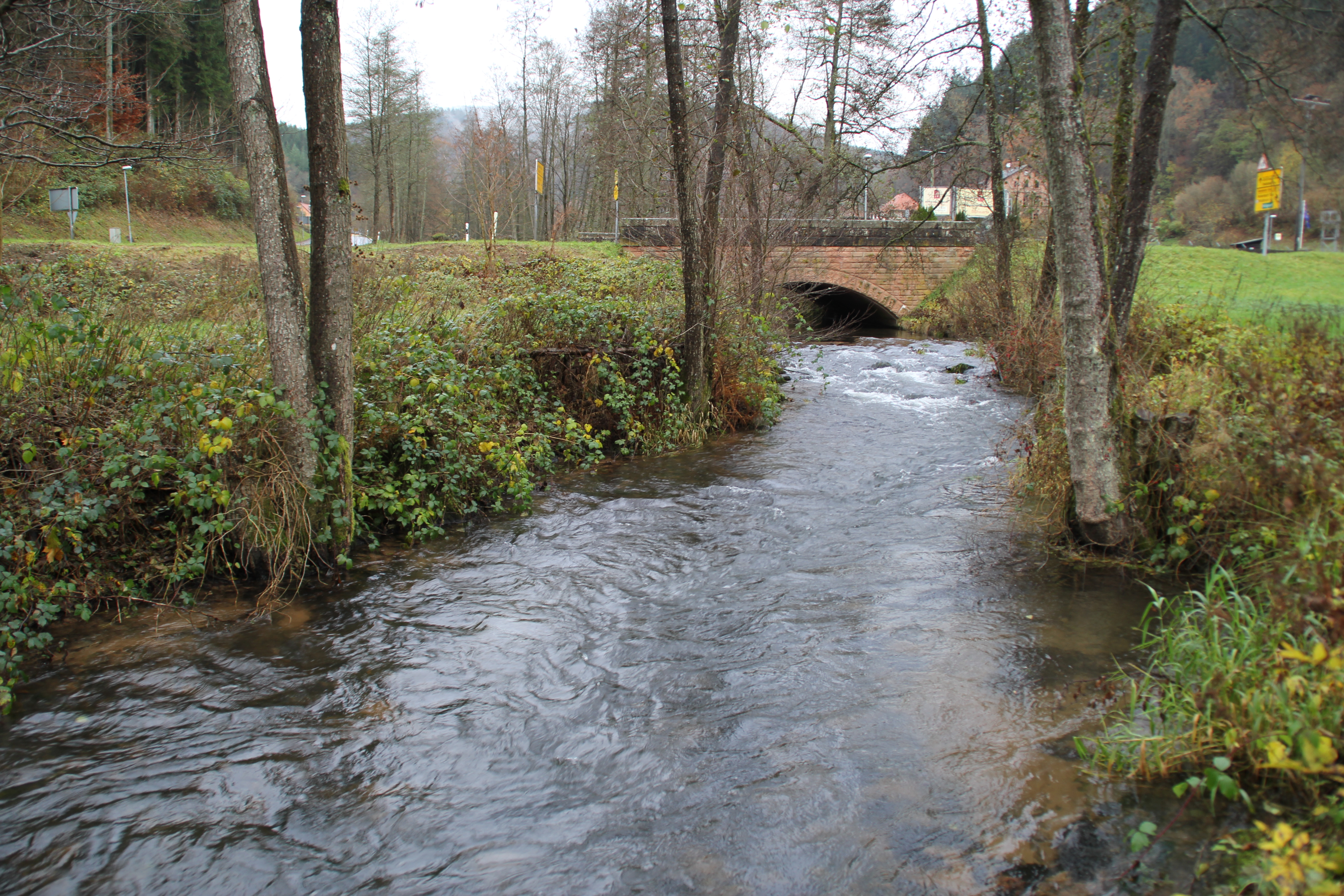

Location
- Country: Germany
- States: Baden-Württemberg; Hesse

Physical characteristics
- Mouth
  - location: Neckar
  - coordinates: 49.4647°N 8.9753°E
- Length: 28.1 km (17.5 mi)
- Basin size: 168 km^{2} (65 sq mi)

Basin features
- Progression: Neckar→ Rhine→ North Sea

The Itter (German pronunciation: [ˈɪtɐ]) is a river in Baden-Württemberg and Hesse, Germany. It flows into the Neckar in Eberbach. In its upper sections it is also called Euterbach and Itterbach.

== See also ==
- List of rivers of Baden-Württemberg
- List of rivers of Hesse
