= Eduard Weiter =

German concentration camp commandant

- Born: 18 July 1889; Eschwege, Hesse-Nassau, Kingdom of Prussia, German Empire
- Died: 2 May 1945 (aged 55) Itter Castle, Tyrol, Austria
- Allegiance: German Empire; Nazi Germany
- Branch: Imperial German Army; Schutzstaffel
- Service years: 1909–1945
- Rank: SS-Obersturmbannführer
- Conflicts: World War I World War II
- Awards: SS Long Service Award

Eduard Weiter (18 July 1889 – 2 May 1945) was a German Schutzstaffel Obersturmbannführer and the final commandant of Dachau concentration camp during World War II.

== Early life ==
The son of a horsewhip maker, Weiter worked as a book salesman whilst studying part-time until he joined the German Imperial Army at the age of 20. He served as a soldier for ten years, seeing action on the Eastern, Western and Balkan fronts during the course of World War I. He served as divisional and then regimental paymaster and following the reductions in the German military that followed the Treaty of Versailles he took up a similar position in the Bavarian police.

== SS career ==
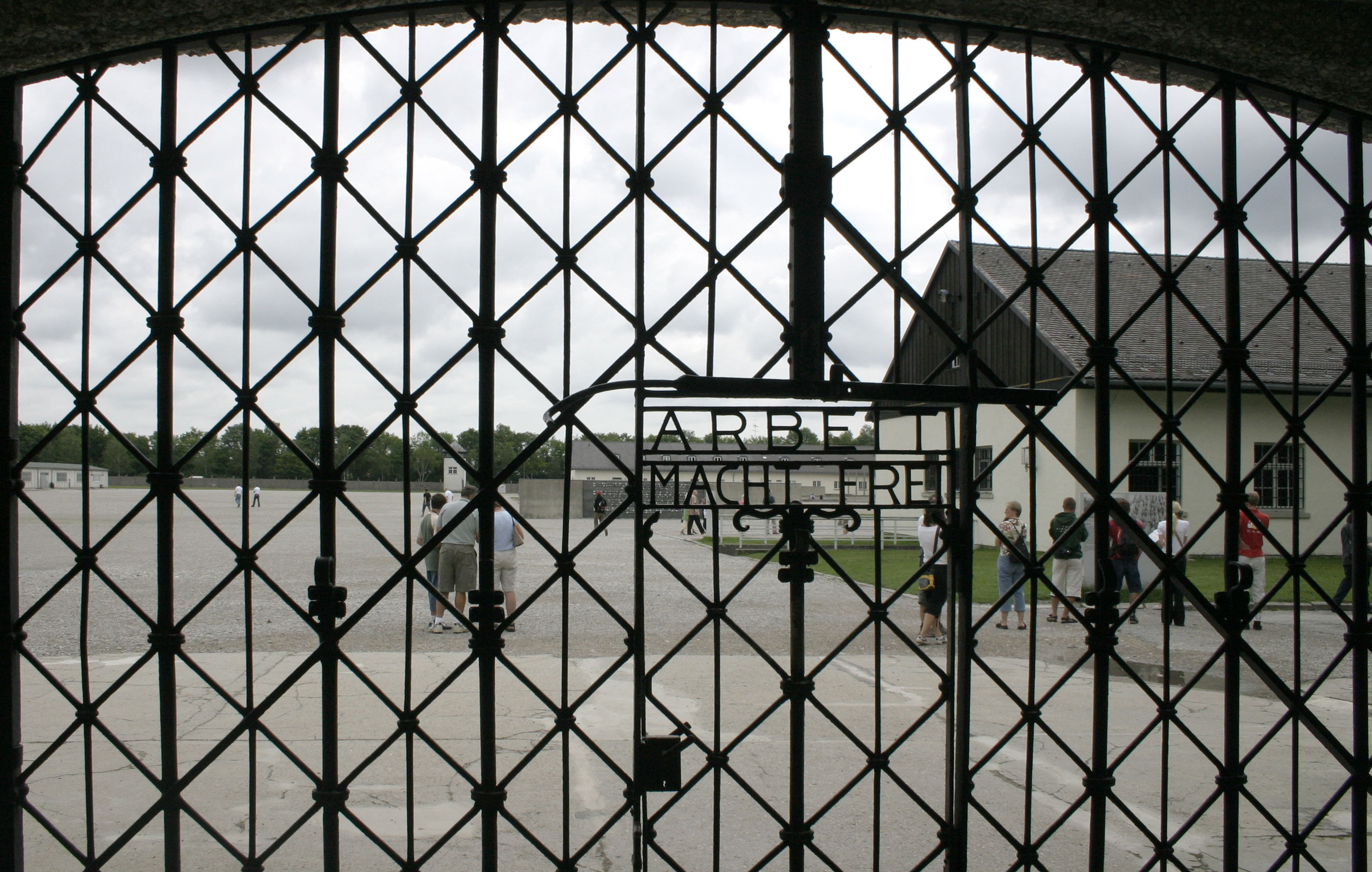
The main gate at Dachau concentration camp, marked with the slogan, Arbeit macht frei

Weiter continued as an anonymous bureaucrat until in 1936 he retired from his paymaster role, the Bavarian police having been incorporated as a unit into the Ordnungspolizei. He then took a role with the SS, although once again as a paymaster and even at this point Weiter wrote that he had no particular political beliefs or identity. Indeed, he did not join the Nazi Party until 1937. Weiter did win the favour of Oswald Pohl, but his ambivalence to politics slowed down his advancement; and even when, during the Second World War, he was put in charge of administering Dachau concentration camp, it was still a bureaucratic role away from the actual camp.

Despite this, Weiter succeeded Martin Weiss as camp commandant on 30 September 1943. Inmate accounts suggest that Weiter's regime was characterised by the same anonymity that had defined his career, as he was rarely seen around the camp. Conditions did decline, however, notably due to overcrowding (as other more easterly camps were closed), but Weiter made little attempt to expand Dachau to cope with this influx. It is also likely that Weiter personally killed the dissident Georg Elser, whose death was officially announced by Weiter as having been caused by an air raid. After the war, a letter to Weiter from Heinrich Müller was discovered in which the order was given that Elser was to be killed and that the death was to be blamed on a bombing raid. Inmate leaders would later testify that Weiter had spoken to them shortly before leaving Dachau in an attempt to get them to testify to his lack of direct cruelty at any subsequent trial.

== Death ==
Weiter did not face trial, as he fled Dachau immediately before its liberation in mid-April 1945 and reached a Dachau subcamp near castle Schloss Itter in Austria, where he died under mysterious circumstances.

According to Paul Reynaud, Weiter committed suicide by gunshot after drunkenly bragging about the recent executions he had ordered at Dachau. The date is given as either 27 April or 2 May. However, historian Tom Segev states that he may have been killed by a fellow SS member angry at his lack of ideological conviction. He was unceremoniously buried outside the walls of the castle in an unmarked grave.
