= Itter Castle =

C19 building in Itter, Tyrol, Austria

- Schloss Itter
- Itter, Tyrol, Austria
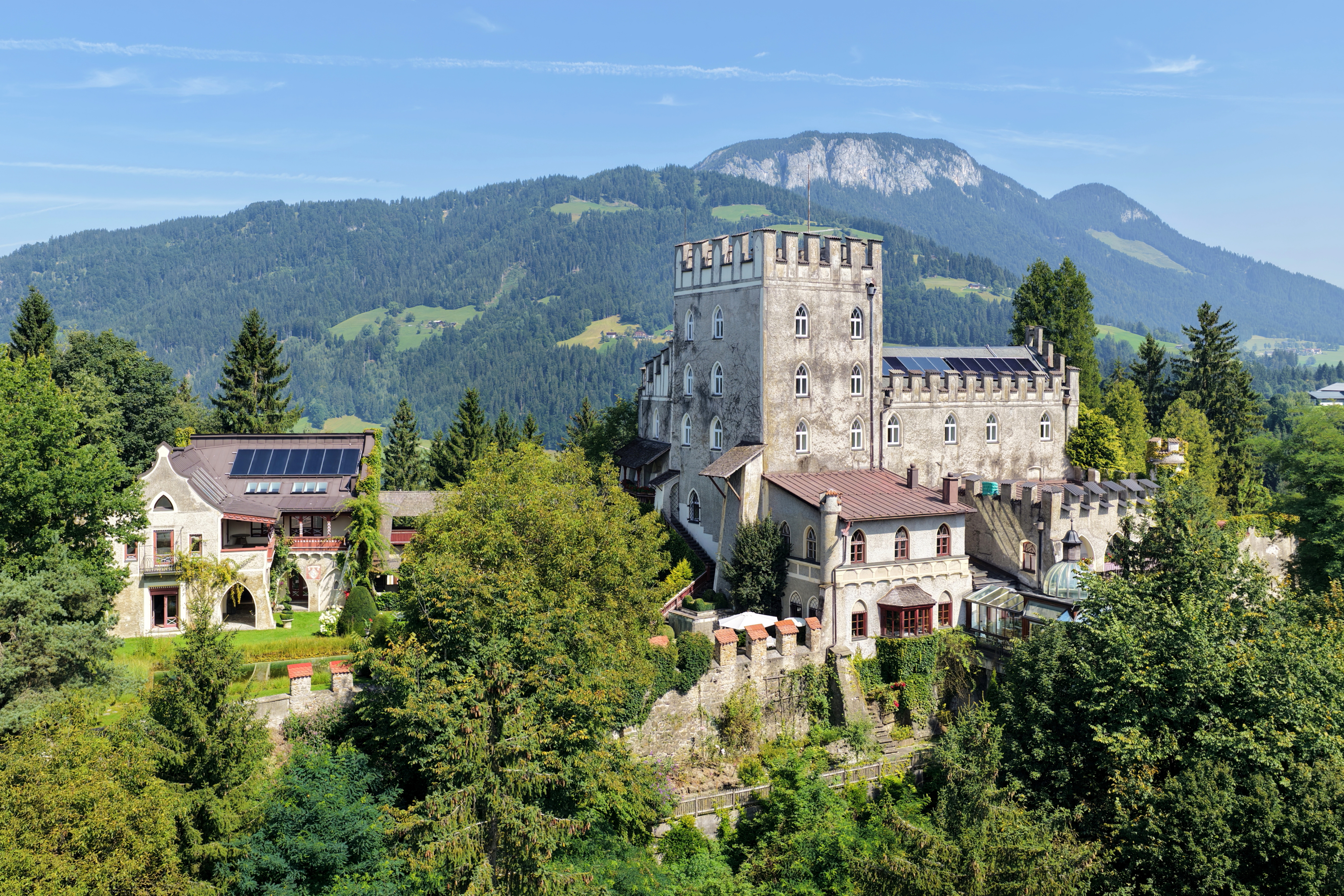
- Itter Castle, view from south, August 2025

Site information
- Type: Castle
- Owner: Privately owned
- Open to the public: No

Location
- Shown within Austria
- Coordinates: 47°28′14″N 12°8′23″E

Site history
- Battles/wars: Battle of Castle Itter

Itter Castle (German: Schloss Itter) is a 19th-century castle in Itter, a village in Tyrol, Austria. In 1943, during World War II, it was turned into a Nazi prison for French VIPs. The castle was the site of an extraordinary instance of the U.S. Army, German Wehrmacht, Austrian Resistance, and the prisoners themselves fighting side-by-side against the Waffen-SS in the Battle for Castle Itter in early May 1945 before the end of the war in Europe.

== Location ==
The hill castle is atop a 666-metre (2,185 ft) knoll at the entrance to the Brixental valley, about 5 kilometres (3.1 mi) south of Wörgl and 20 kilometres (12 mi) west of Kitzbühel.

== History ==
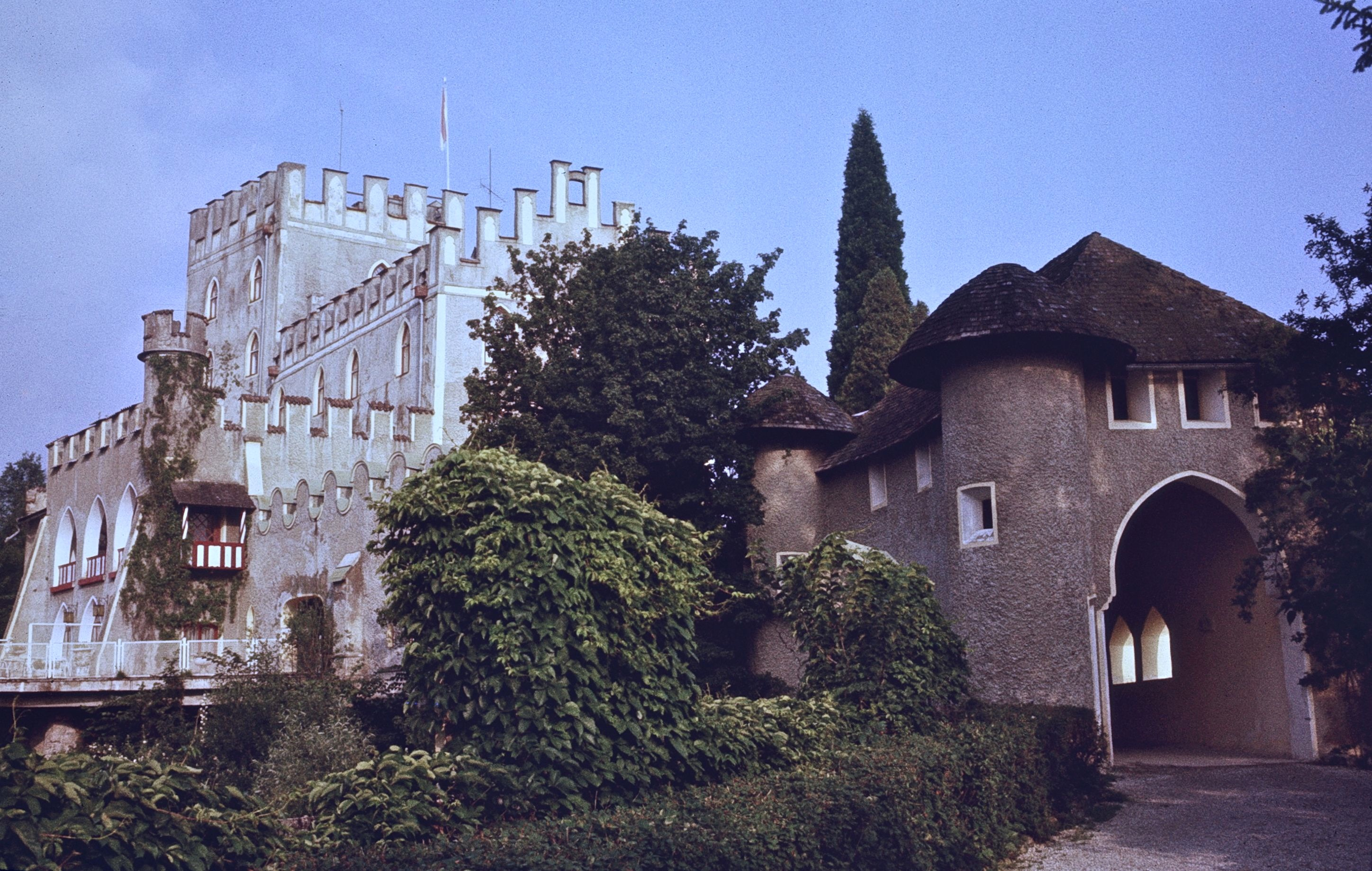
Entrance, July 1979

A fortress at the site was first mentioned in a 1241 deed; previous constructions may have existed since the 10th century. The Brixental originally was a possession of the Prince-Bishops of Regensburg; the castle was an administrative seat of the Counts of Ortenburg in their capacity as Vogt bailiffs, and it also served to protect the Regensburg estates from incursions undertaken by the neighbouring Archbishops of Salzburg. Nevertheless, the Brixental was acquired by Salzburg in 1312, and in 1380 the Regensburg bishops finally sold Itter to Archbishop Pilgrim II of Salzburg.

Within the Burgfrieden jurisdiction of Itter, feuds and breach of the public peace were banned, nevertheless the castle was devastated during the German Peasants' War in 1526. In the 17th century, the seat of the local administration was moved to Hopfgarten, whereafter the premises decayed. The Brixental belonged to Salzburg until it fell to the newly established Kingdom of Bavaria in 1805; the Bavarian government left the castle ruin to the Itter citizens who used it as a quarry. Upon the Final Act of the Vienna Congress, the valley became part of the Austrian, crown land of Tyrol in 1816.

The present-day building was erected on the foundations of the former one from 1878 onwards. Itter Castle was purchased as a residence in 1884 by Sophie Menter, pianist, composer, and student of Franz Liszt. Liszt himself as well as young Arthur Rubinstein stayed at the castle; Pyotr Ilyich Tchaikovsky orchestrated one of his compositions during a visit in 1892. Menter sold Itter Castle in 1902; it was again extensively remodeled in its present Tudor Revival style by later owners.

=== World War II ===
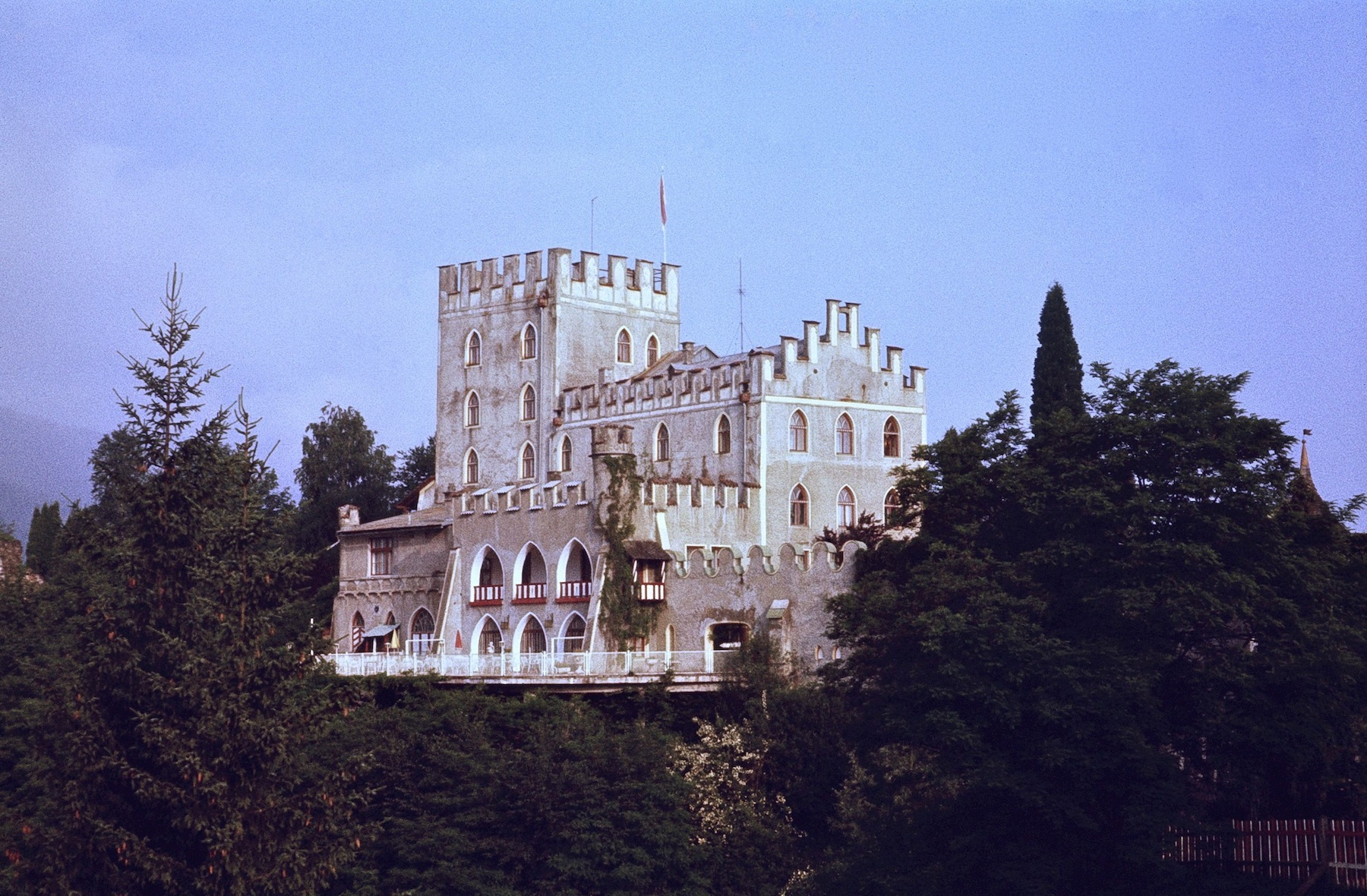
Itter Castle seen from the southeast, 1979

After the 1938 Anschluss annexation of Austria by Nazi Germany, the Reich government officially leased the castle in late 1940 from its owner, Franz Grüner. Itter Castle was seized from Grüner by SS Lieutenant General Oswald Pohl under the orders of Heinrich Himmler on February 7, 1943, and transformed into a prison by April 25, 1943. Established to incarcerate prominent French prisoners valuable to Nazi Germany, the facility was placed as a subcamp under the administration of the Dachau concentration camp.

Notable prisoners included former Prime Ministers Édouard Daladier and Paul Reynaud; Generals Maurice Gamelin and former commander-in-chief Maxime Weygand, who had been prominent during the Phoney War; former tennis champion Jean Borotra, later General Commissioner of Sports in the Vichy regime; right-wing leader François de La Rocque, leader of the right-wing Croix de Feu movement; trade union leader Léon Jouhaux; André François-Poncet, a politician and diplomat; and Michel Clemenceau, politician and son of Georges Clemenceau. The former republic president Albert Lebrun was held at Itter for three months in 1943, before being sent back to France for health reasons; Marie-Agnès de Gaulle, Resistance member and sister of General Charles de Gaulle, was interned in the castle at the very end of the war, in April 1945.

Besides the French VIP prisoners, the Castle held a number of Eastern European prisoners detached from Dachau, who were used for maintenance and other menial work.

=== Battle of Castle Itter ===
On the afternoon of May 4, 1945, the Dachau prison's commander, Eduard Weiter, fled to Castle Itter where he died under unclear circumstances. Shortly after the SS-Totenkopfverbände guards fled, the prisoners armed themselves and awaited an anticipated attack from Waffen SS troops still aggressively resisting surrender. Two Sherman tanks of the 23rd Tank Battalion of the U.S. 12th Armored Division under the command of Capt. John C. ‘Jack’ Lee Jr., and anti-Nazi elements of the Wehrmacht under the command of Major Josef ‘Sepp’ Gangl, arrived. Together the three groups repelled probes by SS reconnaissance elements throughout the night. The battle continued through the morning of 5 May, with a strong force of 100–150 SS pressing the attack until reinforcements from the American 142nd Infantry Regiment arrived around 4 PM that day.

== Preservation ==
After the war, the castle fell into disrepair until 1950 when Willi Woldrich acquired it and turned it into a luxury hotel. However, the hotel encountered financial problems and it was acquired by a holding company before it was sold to a private owner in 1985. Since that time, it has remained in private ownership and is not open to the public. It is owned by attorney Dr. Ernst Bosin from the city of Kufstein, Austria.

== Sources ==
- Harding, Stephen (2013). The Last Battle: When U. S. and German Soldiers Joined Forces in the Waning Hours of World War II in Europe. Da Capo Press, Incorporated. ISBN 978-0-306-82209-4.
