= Iteration (disambiguation) =

Iteration means the act of repeating in the contexts of mathematics, computing and project management, particularly software development.

It can also refer to:

- Iterated function, in mathematics
- "Iteration", a song from Potemkin City Limits, the fourth full-length album by the punk rock band Propagandhi
- Iteration, a 2017 album by American electronic music producer Seth Haley, released under his alias Com Truise
- Iterations, a 2002 collection of short stories by Canadian science fiction author Robert J. Sawyer as well as the title of a story in that collection
- Iterative and incremental development, a term in new product development that came from software development
- Iterative aspect in linguistics
