= Gustave Paul Lacapelle =

French general (1869–1942)

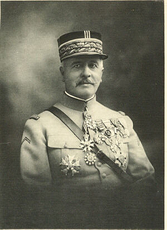
- Born: 8 October 1869; Troyes, Aube, France
- Died: 15 February 1942 (aged 72); Paris, Seine, France
- Burial place: Père Lachaise Cemetery, 20th arrondissement, Paris, France
- Education: École spéciale militaire de Saint-Cyr
- Spouse: Geneviève Marie Joséphine Cornudet (m. 1899)
- Military career
- Allegiance: France
- Branch: French Army
- Service years: 1887 – 1931
- Rank: Général de Corps d'Armée
- Commands: 4th Infantry Battalion; 37th Infantry Regiment; 28th Infantry Division; 66th Infantry Division; 1st Army Corps; 13th Army Corps
- Conflicts: World War I: Battle of the Frontiers; Battle of Lorraine; Somme offensive; Battle of the Somme; Nivelle Offensive; Second Battle of the Aisne; German spring offensive; Battle of Soissons; Hundred Days Offensive; Battle of Saint-Mihiel; Meuse–Argonne offensive
- Awards: Grand Officer of the Legion of Honor

Commander of the 13th Army Corps
- In office 13 May – 1 August 1919
- President: Raymond Poincaré
- Minister of War: Georges Clemenceau
- Chief of Staff: Henri Alby
- Preceded by: Henri Linder
- Succeeded by: Henri Linder

Commander of the 28th Infantry Division
- In office 11 February – 13 May 1919
- President: Raymond Poincaré
- Minister of War: Georges Clemenceau
- Chief of Staff: Henri Alby
- Preceded by: Rene Madelin
- Succeeded by: Alfred de Corn

Commander of the 1st Army Corps
- In office 19 April 1917 – 11 February 1919
- President: Raymond Poincaré
- Minister of War: Paul Painlevé; Georges Clemenceau
- Chief of Staff: Philippe Pétain; Ferdinand Foch; Henri Alby
- Preceded by: Paul Muteau
- Succeeded by: Charles Nollet
- In office 1 August 1919 – 4 June 1929
- President: Raymond Poincaré; Paul Deschanel; Alexandre Millerand; Gaston Doumergue
- Minister of War: Georges Clemenceau; André Lefèvre; Flaminius Raiberti; Louis Barthou; André Maginot; Charles Nollet; Paul Painlevé; Édouard Daladier; Paul Painlevé; Adolphe Guillaumat; Paul Painlevé
- Chief of Staff: Henri Alby; Edmond Buat; Marie Eugène Debeney
- Preceded by: Charles Nollet
- Succeeded by: General Pétin (1930)

Commander of the 66th Infantry Division
- In office 12 May 1916 – 18 April 1917
- President: Raymond Poincaré
- Minister of War: Pierre Roques; Hubert Lyautey; Lucien Lacaze (as interim); Paul Painlevé
- Chief of Staff: Joseph Joffre; Robert Nivelle
- Preceded by: Charles Nollet
- Succeeded by: fr:Georges Brissaud-Desmaillet

Commander of the 37th Infantry Regiment
- In office 22 September 1914 – 31 March 1915
- President: Raymond Poincaré
- Minister of War: Alexandre Millerand
- Chief of Staff: Joseph Joffre
- Preceded by: Paul Joseph Jean Hector de Lobit
- Succeeded by: Eugène Henri Harrier

Gustave Paul Lacapelle was a French Général de Corps d'Armée of World War I. He was known for commanding the 1st and 13th Army Corps and for his participation during the Battle of Soissons. He was also a recipient of the Grand Officer of the Legion of Honor.

== Early Military Career ==
Gustave was born in Troyes, Aube as the son of the French officer Albert Auguste Nicolas Lacapelle and Marguerite Charlotte du Houx. He attended the École spéciale militaire de Saint-Cyr in 1887 and graduated in 1889, ranking 12th out of 446 students and was a second lieutenant of the 6th Alpine Chasseurs Battalion at Nice. Lacapelle was promoted to captain in April 1898 and enrolled in the École de guerre and married Geneviève Marie Joséphine Cornudet (1876-1954) on 30 April 1899. He graduated in November 1900 and ranked 17th out of 80 but remained as a trainee until February 1903 after serving with the 85th Infantry Regiment.

== World War I ==
From November 1903 to June 1905, he served in the 2nd RTA in Algeria and, on May 1, he served in the Sahara. Returning to mainland France to the staff of the 25th Infantry Division and later to the 25th Infantry Regiment. He was promoted to battalion chief in November 1909 and assigned to the 91st Infantry Regiment then to the command of the 4th Army Corps on Christmas 1911 and was made a Chevalier of the Legion of Honor on 30 December 1911. While commanding the "Chasseurs de Saint-Nicolas", World War I broke out and Lacapelle experienced his first active combat at the Battle of Lorraine in August 1914. Promoted to Lieutenant-Colonel on 3 September 1914, he commanded the 37th Infantry Regiment until his promotion to the rank of colonel and was made an officer of the Legion of Honor on 24 November 1914, with the following citation:

Since the beginning of the campaign, he has shown the most brilliant qualities of command; was wounded while leading his regiment to attack; came to regain command without being fully recovered. For six consecutive days, he fought fiercely and contributed with his energy to regaining with his regiment the ground lost a few days earlier by another unit, thus restoring a situation which could've been considered critical.

From March 1915, he commanded the 4th Chasseurs Brigade on an interim basis until October as he was then made the Chief of Staff of the 7th Army but suffered a car accident from which he came out with his foot burnt. In May 1916, Lacapelle was promoted to Brigadier General on a temporary basis and commanded the 66th Infantry Division on an interim basis. He then became a Général de Division on a temporary basis in April 1917 and he took command of the 1st Army Corps. During the final months of World War I, he participated at the Battle of Saint-Mihiel and the Meuse–Argonne offensive. He permanently became a Général de Division in March 1919 and was placed at the head of the 28th Infantry Division while provisionally commanding the 13th Army Corps two months later.

On 1 August 1919 he was appointed commander of the 1st Army Corps and the 1st Military Region at Lille and remained so until 4 June 1929, when he became Military Governor of Metz, commanding the 6th Military Region. Lacapelle also became a recipient of the Commander of the Legion of Honor in June 1920. He made his official entry into his new stronghold on July 8 and was made Grand Officer of the Legion of Honor on 25 December 1929.

== Later years ==
He left the service in October 1931 after being made Grand Cross of the Legion of Honor. He then became president of Le Souvenir français. As such, he organized the census of the graves of the 100,000 soldiers who died during the Battle of France in order to maintain them but he died on 15 February 1942 in Paris. Lacapelle is buried at the Père Lachaise Cemetery at the 94th division.
