= Denis Auguste Duchêne =

French general

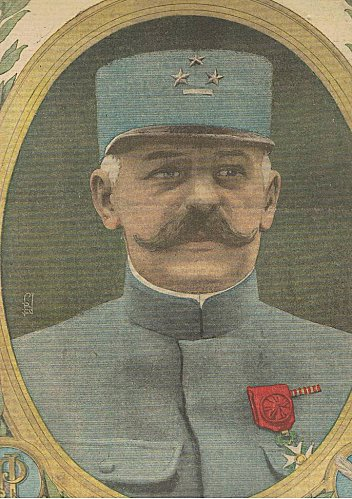
- General Duchêne
- Born: 23 September 1862; Juzennecourt, France
- Died: 9 June 1950 (aged 87); Bihorel, France
- Military career
- Allegiance: France
- Branch: French Army
- Service years: 1881–1924
- Rank: General de division
- Commands: French Sixth Army
- Conflicts: World War I
- Awards: Grand Officer of the Légion d'honneur Croix de guerre 1914–1918

Commander of the 3rd Army Corps
- In office 21 September 1921 – 23 September 1924
- President: Alexandre Millerand; Gaston Doumergue
- Minister of War: Louis Barthou; André Maginot; Charles Nollet
- Chief of Staff: Edmond Buat; Eugène Debeney
- Preceded by: Stanislas Naulin
- Succeeded by: Albert de Corn

Commander of the 6th Army
- In office 11 December 1917 – 10 June 1918
- President: Raymond Poincaré
- Minister of War: Georges Clemenceau
- Chief of Staff: Ferdinand Foch
- Preceded by: Paul Maistre
- Succeeded by: Jean Degoutte

Commander of the 10th Army
- In office 27 December 1916 – 11 December 1917
- President: Raymond Poincaré
- Minister of War: Hubert Lyautey; Lucien Lacaze (as interim); Paul Painlevé; Georges Clemenceau
- Chief of Staff: Robert Nivelle; Philippe Pétain; Ferdinand Foch
- Preceded by: Joseph Alfred Micheler
- Succeeded by: Paul Maistre

Commander of the 2nd Army Corps
- In office 10 August 1915 – 29 December 1916
- President: Raymond Poincaré
- Minister of War: Alexandre Millerand; Joseph Gallieni; Pierre Roques; Hubert Lyautey
- Chief of Staff: Joseph Joffre; Robert Nivelle
- Preceded by: Frédéric-Georges Herr
- Succeeded by: Edmond Buat

Denis Auguste Duchene (23 September 1862 – 9 June 1950) was a French World War I general.

He was born on 23 September 1862 at Juzennecourt, Haute-Marne and died on 9 June 1950 at Bihorel, Seine-Inférieure. He was promoted General de Brigade (brigadier-general) on 27 October 1914, then acting General de Division (equivalent to the Anglophone rank of major-general) on 12 March 1915 with the rank confirmed on 28 September 1916.
He commanded the French Tenth Army between December 1916 and December 1917.

Duchêne is best known for his command of the French Sixth Army from December 1917 to June 1918. During the Third Battle of the Aisne (the Blücher-Yorck phase of the German spring offensive), Duchêne's group held the high ground of the Chemin des Dames. However, he was openly contemptuous of General Philippe Pétain's order to maintain a defence in depth, preferring instead to consolidate his troops in the front line. When the Germans attacked in late May 1918, his line broke and crossed the river Aisne. The German armies poured through, taking 19 kilometres in three days, and putting Paris within their reach.

Duchêne was relieved of his command by French prime minister Georges Clemenceau on 9 June 1918. He remained in the army however and was made a Grand Officer of the Légion d'honneur on 16 June 1920. He retired in 1924 as head of the III Corps.

== See also ==
- Marching Regiment of the Foreign Legion

== Notes and references ==
- First World War Retrieved: 8 November 1918.
