= Chief of Staff of the French Army =

Military head of the French Army

Chief of the Army Staff
- Chef d'état-major de l'armée de terre
- Honor flag

- Incumbent; Army General Jacques Langlade de Montgros since 22 July 2021
- Ministry of the Armed Forces
- Type: Chief of Staff
- Abbreviation: CEMAT
- Member of: Chiefs of Staff Committee
- Reports to: Chief of the Defence Staff
- Seat: Hexagone Balard, Paris
- Appointer: President of the Republic; Requires the Prime Minister's countersignature
- Formation: 8 June 1871; 155 years ago
- First holder: François Hartung
- Deputy: Major General of the Army
- Website: defense.gouv.fr/terre

The Chief of the Army Staff (French: Chef d'état-major de l'armée de terre, (Note: French pronunciation: [ʃɛf deta maʒɔʁ də laʁme də tɛʁ], lit. 'Chief of Staff of the Land Army') CEMAT) is the military head of the French Army. The chief directs the army staff and acts as the principal advisor to the Chief of the Defence Staff on subjects concerning the Army. As such, they ensure the operational preparedness of their service branch, express their need for military and civilian personnel, and are responsible for maintaining the discipline, morale and conduct of their troops. Special responsibilities can be assigned to them in relation to nuclear safety.

The chief does not have a fixed term, nor an attached rank. In practice, however, a term has never exceeded five years and all chiefs since the late 1950s have been five–stars generals (OF–09). They are assisted in their duties by the Major General of the Army who will deputise if needed.

General Jacques Langlade de Montgros is the current chief and has been serving since July 2026.

== History ==
=== Creation ===
The office was originally created on 8 June 1871 as Chief of the General Staff of the Army. Following the fall of the Second French Empire, the central administration of the Ministry of War was reorganized. The Chief of Staff had full control of the operations of the army, military engineering services, military justice, and general resources such as the historic and geographic departments. The Chief reported directly to the Minister of War.

However, under some governments, the position was given a lesser importance and was attributed to a Général de brigade, the lowest of the two flag officer ranks existing at the time in the French Army. In normal circumstances, it was filled by a Général de division.

=== First World War ===
In times of war, the Chief of Staff of the French Army took charge of general headquarters (Grand Quartier Général (1914–1919) (GQG)). During the First World War, the leader of the French Armies was variously referred to as generalissimo or commander-in-chief. (Note: This official title (sometimes referred to as Généralissime) gave the Chief of Staff full authority over all French armies.) In the closing years of the First World War I, the establishment of the Supreme War Council in 1917 led to overall command being held by General Ferdinand Foch, and by mid-1918 French Army Chief Philippe Pétain was subordinate to Foch. Although the war ended with the armistice in November 1918, the war-time organisation persisted until 1920.

=== Interwar ===
During the interwar period, command of the French Army was divided between the vice president of the Superior War Council and the chief of the general staff of the Armies. Marshal Philippe Pétain was vice president from 1920 to 1931, when he was replaced by General Weygand. After Weygand retired in 1935 he was succeeded by Gamelin who held the two positions simultaneously.

=== Second World War ===
The position was abolished during the Battle of France and not reestablished until the end of the war.

=== Postwar ===
The modern-day office of Chief of Staff of the Army was created in 1951. The Chief is placed under the authority of the Chief of the Defence Staff and is member of the Chiefs of Staff committee.

== Office holders ==
=== Third Republic ===
No.	Portrait	Rank & Name	Term			Minister	Commander-in-Chief	Ref.
No.	Portrait	Rank & Name	Took office	Left office	Duration	Minister	Commander-in-Chief	Ref.
Office established
1		Brigade general Edmond Hartung	9 June 1871	2 June 1873	1 year, 358 days	Ernest de Cissey; François du Barail	Adolphe Thiers	-
2		Division general Jean-Louis Borel	2 June 1873	2 June 1874	1 year, 0 days	François du Barail; Ernest de Cissey	Patrice de MacMahon	-
3		Division general (Note: Brigade general at the time of his appointment, promoted to Division general while in office.); Henri Gresley	2 June 1874	29 November 1877	3 years, 180 days	Ernest de Cissey; Jean Berthaut; Gaëtan de Rochebouët	Patrice de MacMahon	-
4		Division general Joseph de Miribel	29 November 1877	25 January 1879	1 year, 57 days	Gaëtan de Rochebouët; Jean-Louis Borel; Henri Gresley	Patrice de MacMahon	-
5		Division general Léopold Davout	25 January 1879	11 January 1880	351 days	Henri Gresley; Jean-Joseph Farre	Jules Grévy	-
6		Division general Omer Blot	11 January 1880	16 November 1881	1 year, 309 days	Jean-Joseph Farre; Jean-Baptiste Campenon	Jules Grévy	-
7		Division general Joseph de Miribel	16 November 1881	18 February 1882	94 days	Jean-Baptiste Campenon; Jean-Baptiste Billot	Jules Grévy	-
8		Division general Achile Vuillemot	18 February 1882	5 January 1885	2 years, 322 days	Jean-Baptiste Billot; Jean Thibaudin; Jean-Baptiste Campenon; Jules Lewal	Jules Grévy	-
9		Division general Charles Warnet	5 January 1885	9 April 1885	94 days	Jules Lewal; Jean-Baptiste Campenon	Jules Grévy	-
10		Division general Amédée de Cools	9 April 1885	10 January 1886	276 days	Jean-Baptiste Campenon; Georges Boulanger	Jules Grévy	-
11		Division general Eugène Galland	10 January 1886	14 January 1886	4 days	Georges Boulanger	Jules Grévy	-
12		Division general Savin de Larclause	14 January 1886	6 July 1887	1 year, 173 days	Georges Boulanger; Théophile Ferron	Jules Grévy	-
13		Division general Charles Haillot	6 July 1887	7 May 1890	2 years, 305 days	Théophile Ferron; François Logerot; Charles de Freycinet	Sadi Carnot	-
14		Division general Joseph de Miribel	7 May 1890	29 September 1893	3 years, 145 days	Charles de Freycinet; Julien Léon Loizillon	Sadi Carnot	
15		Division general Raoul de Boisdeffre	29 September 1893	3 September 1898	4 years, 339 days	Julien Loizillon; Auguste Mercier [...] Jean-Baptiste Billot; Jacques Cavaignac	Sadi Carnot	
15		Division general Raoul de Boisdeffre	29 September 1893	3 September 1898	4 years, 339 days	Julien Loizillon; Auguste Mercier [...] Jean-Baptiste Billot; Jacques Cavaignac	Jean Casimir-Perier	
15		Division general Raoul de Boisdeffre	29 September 1893	3 September 1898	4 years, 339 days	Julien Loizillon; Auguste Mercier [...] Jean-Baptiste Billot; Jacques Cavaignac	Félix Faure	
16		Division general Jean Renouard	3 September 1898	5 November 1898	63 days	Jacques Cavaignac; Charles Chanoine; Édouard Locroy; Charles de Freycinet	Félix Faure	-
17		Division general Paul Brault	5 November 1898	27 September 1899†	326 days	Charles de Freycinet; Camille Krantz; Gaston de Galliffet	Félix Faure	
17		Division general Paul Brault	5 November 1898	27 September 1899†	326 days	Charles de Freycinet; Camille Krantz; Gaston de Galliffet	Émile Loubet	
18		Brigade general (Note: Appointed "Chef d'état-major général avec le titre faisant fonction"; faisant fonction is a locution indicating that an officer is holding an office usually attached to a higher rank.); Alfred Delanne	27 September 1899	5 July 1900	281 days	Gaston de Galliffet; Louis André	Émile Loubet	-
19		Division general Jean Pendézec	5 July 1900	2 August 1905	5 years, 28 days	Louis André; Maurice Berteaux	Émile Loubet	
20		Division general Jean Brun	2 August 1905	5 August 1909	4 years, 3 days	Maurice Berteaux; Eugène Étienne; Georges Picquart; Jean Brun	Émile Loubet	
20		Division general Jean Brun	2 August 1905	5 August 1909	4 years, 3 days	Maurice Berteaux; Eugène Étienne; Georges Picquart; Jean Brun	Armand Fallières	
21		Division general Édouard de Ladébat	5 August 1909	31 May 1911	1 year, 299 days	Jean Brun; Aristide Briand; Maurice Berteaux; François Goiran	Armand Fallières	
22		Division general Augustin Dubail	31 May 1911	29 July 1911	59 days	François Goiran; Adolphe Messimy	Armand Fallières	
23		Division general Joseph Joffre	29 July 1911	14 December 1916	5 years, 138 days	Adolphe Messimy; Alexandre Millerand [...] Pierre Roques; Hubert Lyautey	Armand Fallières	
23		Division general Joseph Joffre	29 July 1911	14 December 1916	5 years, 138 days	Adolphe Messimy; Alexandre Millerand [...] Pierre Roques; Hubert Lyautey	Raymond Poincaré	
24		Division general Robert Nivelle	14 December 1916	30 April 1917	137 days	Hubert Lyautey; Lucien Lacaze; Paul Painlevé	Raymond Poincaré	-
25		Division general Philippe Pétain	30 April 1917	16 May 1917	16 days	Paul Painlevé	Raymond Poincaré	-
26		Division general (Note: Subsequently appointed Supreme Allied Commander (1918–1920).); Ferdinand Foch	16 May 1917	29 December 1918	1 year, 227 days	Paul Painlevé; Georges Clemenceau	Raymond Poincaré	-
27		Division general Henri Alby	29 December 1918	25 January 1920	1 year, 27 days	Georges Clemenceau; André Lefèvre	Raymond Poincaré	-
28		Division general Edmond Buat	25 January 1920	30 December 1923†	3 years, 339 days	André Lefèvre; Flaminius Raiberti; Louis Barthou; André Maginot	Paul Deschanel	
28		Division general Edmond Buat	25 January 1920	30 December 1923†	3 years, 339 days	André Lefèvre; Flaminius Raiberti; Louis Barthou; André Maginot	Alexandre Millerand	
29		Division general Eugène Debeney	9 January 1924	3 January 1930	5 years, 359 days	André Maginot; Charles Nollet [...] Paul Painlevé; André Maginot	Alexandre Millerand	-
29		Division general Eugène Debeney	9 January 1924	3 January 1930	5 years, 359 days	André Maginot; Charles Nollet [...] Paul Painlevé; André Maginot	Gaston Doumergue	-
30		Division general Maxime Weygand	3 January 1930	10 February 1931	1 year, 38 days	André Maginot; Louis Barthou; André Maginot	Gaston Doumergue	-
31		Division general Maurice Gamelin	10 February 1931	20 May 1940	9 years, 100 days	André Maginot; André Tardieu [...] Louis Maurin; Édouard Daladier	Gaston Doumergue	
31		Division general Maurice Gamelin	10 February 1931	20 May 1940	9 years, 100 days	André Maginot; André Tardieu [...] Louis Maurin; Édouard Daladier	Paul Doumer	
31		Division general Maurice Gamelin	10 February 1931	20 May 1940	9 years, 100 days	André Maginot; André Tardieu [...] Louis Maurin; Édouard Daladier	Albert Lebrun	
Office disestablished (1940–1945)

=== Fourth Republic ===
No.	Portrait	Rank & Name	Term			Minister (Note: The Minister of War was responsible until 1947, after which the Minister of the Armed Forces took over.)	Commander-in-Chief	Ref.
No.	Portrait	Rank & Name	Took office	Left office	Duration	Minister	Commander-in-Chief	Ref.
Office reestablished
32		Army general Jean de Lattre	30 November 1945	12 March 1947	1 year, 102 days	Edmond Michelet; Félix Gouin; Georges Bidault; François Billoux	Charles de Gaulle	-
32		Army general Jean de Lattre	30 November 1945	12 March 1947	1 year, 102 days	Edmond Michelet; Félix Gouin; Georges Bidault; François Billoux	Félix Gouin	-
32		Army general Jean de Lattre	30 November 1945	12 March 1947	1 year, 102 days	Edmond Michelet; Félix Gouin; Georges Bidault; François Billoux	Georges Bidault	-
32		Army general Jean de Lattre	30 November 1945	12 March 1947	1 year, 102 days	Edmond Michelet; Félix Gouin; Georges Bidault; François Billoux	Vincent Auriol	-
33		Corps general Georges Revers	12 March 1947	15 December 1949	2 years, 278 days	François Billoux; Yvon Delbos [...] Paul Ramadier; René Pleven	Vincent Auriol	
34		Corps general Clément Blanc	15 December 1949	16 June 1955	5 years, 183 days	René Pleven; Jules Moch [...] Jacques Chevallier; Marie-Pierre Kœnig	Vincent Auriol	-
34		Corps general Clément Blanc	15 December 1949	16 June 1955	5 years, 183 days	René Pleven; Jules Moch [...] Jacques Chevallier; Marie-Pierre Kœnig	René Coty	-
35		Army general André Zeller	16 June 1955	2 March 1956	260 days	Marie-Pierre Kœnig; Pierre Billotte; Maurice Bourgès-Maunoury	René Coty	-
36		Corps general Jean Piatte	2 March 1956	11 November 1956	254 days	Maurice Bourgès-Maunoury	René Coty	-
37		Corps general Henri Lorillot	11 November 1956	2 July 1958	1 year, 233 days	Maurice Bourgès-Maunoury; André Morice; Jacques Chaban-Delmas; Pierre de Chevigné; Charles de Gaulle	René Coty	-

=== Fifth Republic ===
No.	Portrait	Rank & Name	Term			Minister	Commander-in-Chief	Ref.
No.	Portrait	Rank & Name	Took office	Left office	Duration	Minister	Commander-in-Chief	Ref.
38		Army general André Zeller	2 July 1958	1 October 1959	1 year, 91 days	Charles de Gaulle; Pierre Guillaumat	René Coty	-
38		Army general André Zeller	2 July 1958	1 October 1959	1 year, 91 days	Charles de Gaulle; Pierre Guillaumat	Charles de Gaulle	-
39		Army general André Demetz	1 October 1959	18 July 1962	2 years, 290 days	Pierre Guillaumat; Pierre Messmer	Charles de Gaulle	-
40		Army general Louis Le Puloch	18 July 1962	3 April 1965	2 years, 260 days	Pierre Messmer	Charles de Gaulle	-
41		Army general Émile Cantarel	3 April 1965	1 May 1971	6 years, 28 days	Pierre Messmer; Michel Debré	Charles de Gaulle	-
41		Army general Émile Cantarel	3 April 1965	1 May 1971	6 years, 28 days	Pierre Messmer; Michel Debré	Georges Pompidou	-
42		Army general Alain de Boissieu	1 May 1971	1 April 1975	3 years, 335 days	Michel Debré; Robert Galley; Jacques Soufflet; Yvon Bourges	Georges Pompidou	
42		Army general Alain de Boissieu	1 May 1971	1 April 1975	3 years, 335 days	Michel Debré; Robert Galley; Jacques Soufflet; Yvon Bourges	Valéry Giscard d'Estaing	
43		Army general Jean Lagarde	1 April 1975	1 October 1980	5 years, 183 days	Yvon Bourges; Joël Le Theule	Valéry Giscard d'Estaing	-
44		Army general Jean Delaunay	1 October 1980	10 March 1983	2 years, 160 days	Robert Galley; Charles Hernu	Valéry Giscard d'Estaing	
44		Army general Jean Delaunay	1 October 1980	10 March 1983	2 years, 160 days	Robert Galley; Charles Hernu	François Mitterrand	
45		Army general René Imbot	10 March 1983	25 September 1985	2 years, 199 days	Charles Hernu	François Mitterrand	
46		Army general Maurice Schmitt	25 September 1985	16 November 1987	2 years, 52 days	Paul Quilès; André Giraud	François Mitterrand	
47		Army general Gilbert Forray	16 November 1987	17 April 1991	3 years, 152 days	André Giraud; Jean-Pierre Chevènement; Pierre Joxe	François Mitterrand	
48		Army general Marc Monchal	17 April 1991	28 August 1996	5 years, 133 days	Pierre Bérégovoy; François Léotard; Charles Millon	François Mitterrand	
48		Army general Marc Monchal	17 April 1991	28 August 1996	5 years, 133 days	Pierre Bérégovoy; François Léotard; Charles Millon	Jacques Chirac	
49		Army general Philippe Mercier	28 August 1996	21 January 1999	2 years, 146 days	Charles Millon; Alain Richard	Jacques Chirac	-
50		Army general Yves Crène	21 January 1999	1 September 2002	3 years, 223 days	Alain Richard; Michèle Alliot-Marie	Jacques Chirac	
51		Army general Bernard Thorette	1 September 2002	16 July 2006	3 years, 318 days	Michèle Alliot-Marie	Jacques Chirac	
52		Army general Bruno Cuche	16 July 2006	3 July 2008	1 year, 353 days	Michèle Alliot-Marie; Hervé Morin	Jacques Chirac	
52		Army general Bruno Cuche	16 July 2006	3 July 2008	1 year, 353 days	Michèle Alliot-Marie; Hervé Morin	Nicolas Sarkozy	
53		Army general Elrick Irastorza	3 July 2008	1 September 2011	3 years, 60 days	Hervé Morin; Alain Juppé; Gérard Longuet	Nicolas Sarkozy	
54		Army general Bertrand Ract-Madoux	1 September 2011	1 September 2014	3 years, 0 days	Gérard Longuet; Jean-Yves Le Drian	Nicolas Sarkozy	-
54		Army general Bertrand Ract-Madoux	1 September 2011	1 September 2014	3 years, 0 days	Gérard Longuet; Jean-Yves Le Drian	François Hollande	-
55		Army general Jean-Pierre Bosser	1 September 2014	31 July 2019	4 years, 333 days	Jean-Yves Le Drian; Sylvie Goulard; Florence Parly	François Hollande	-
55		Army general Jean-Pierre Bosser	1 September 2014	31 July 2019	4 years, 333 days	Jean-Yves Le Drian; Sylvie Goulard; Florence Parly	Emmanuel Macron	-
56		Army general Thierry Burkhard	31 July 2019	22 July 2021	1 year, 356 days	Florence Parly	Emmanuel Macron	
57		Army general Pierre Schill	22 July 2021	Incumbent	5 years, 113 days	Florence Parly; Sébastien Lecornu	Emmanuel Macron	-

== See also ==
- Chief of the Defence Staff
  - Chief of Staff of the Air Force
  - Chief of Staff of the Navy
  - Special Operations Command
  - Directorate General of the National Gendarmerie
