= Adolphe Guillaumat =

French Army general (1863–1940)

Marie Louis Adolphe Guillaumat
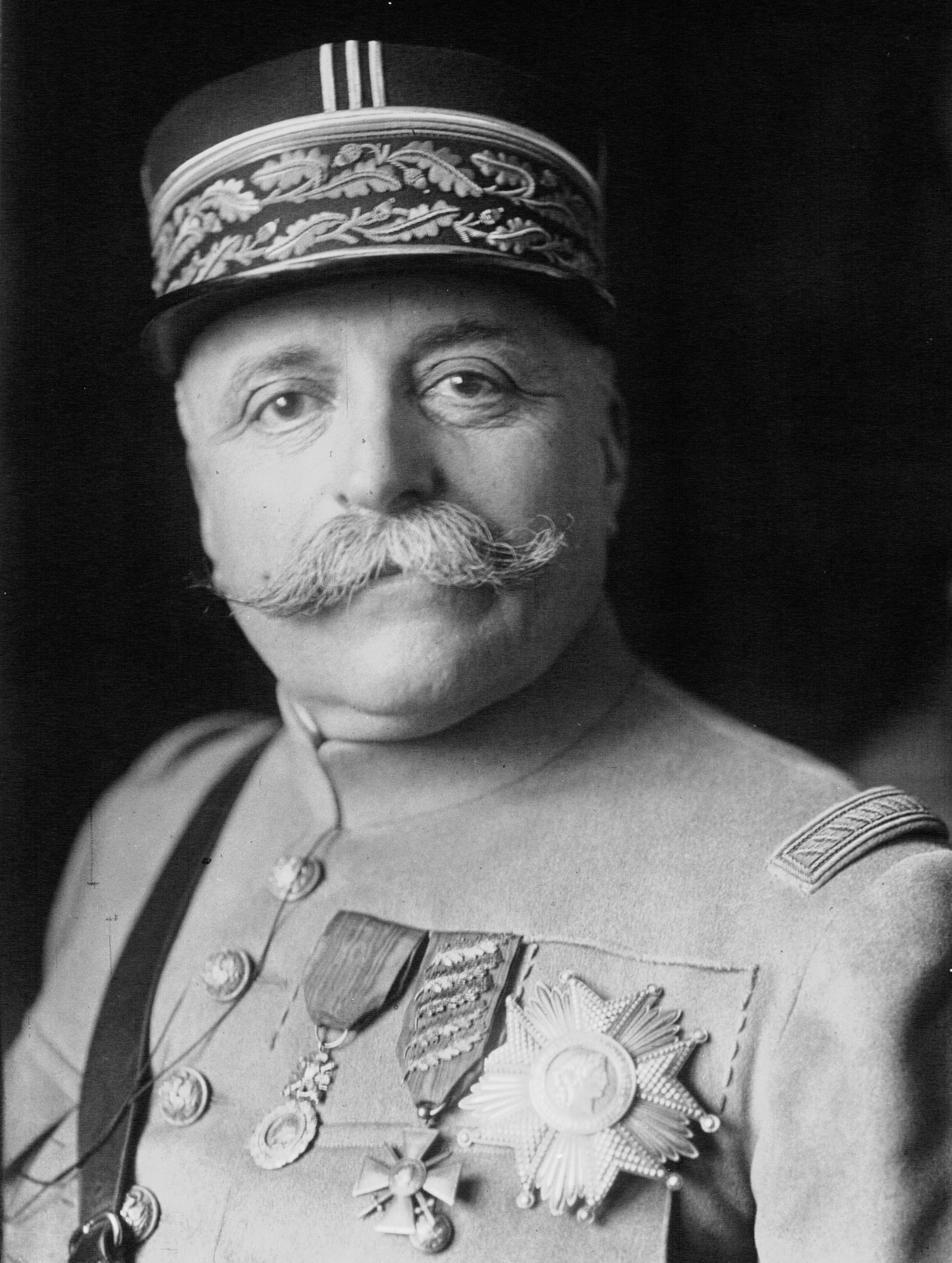
- Born: 4 January 1863; Bourgneuf, Charente-Maritime, France
- Died: 18 May 1940 (aged 77); Nantes, France
- Relatives: Pierre Guillaumat (son)
- Military career
- Allegiance: France
- Branch: French Army
- Service years: 1884–1930
- Rank: Army general
- Conflicts: World War I

Minister of War of France
- In office 23 June – 19 July 1926
- President: Gaston Doumergue
- Prime Minister: Aristide Briand
- Preceded by: Paul Painlevé
- Succeeded by: Paul Painlevé

Military governor of Paris
- In office 17 June – 7 October 1918
- Preceded by: Augustin Dubail
- Succeeded by: Charles Émile Moinier

Commander of the 33rd Infantry Division
- In office 30 August – 9 December 1914
- President: Raymond Poincaré
- Minister of War: Alexandre Millerand
- Chief of Staff: Joseph Joffre
- Preceded by: François de Villeméjane
- Succeeded by: General Desvaux

Commander of the 4th Infantry Division
- In office 9 December 1914 – 25 February 1915
- President: Raymond Poincaré
- Minister of War: Alexandre Millerand
- Chief of Staff: Joseph Joffre
- Preceded by: General Rabier
- Succeeded by: General Lebrun

Commander of the 1st Army Corps
- In office 25 February 1915 – 17 December 1916
- President: Raymond Poincaré
- Minister of War: Alexandre Millerand; Joseph Gallieni; Pierre Roques
- Chief of Staff: Joseph Joffre; Robert Nivelle
- Preceded by: Henry Victor Deligny
- Succeeded by: Jacques Élie de Riols de Fonclare

Commander of the 2nd Army
- In office 15 December 1916 – 11 December 1917
- President: Raymond Poincaré
- Minister of War: Pierre Roques; Hubert Lyautey; Lucien Lacaze (as interim); Paul Painlevé
- Chief of Staff: Robert Nivelle; Philippe Pétain; Ferdinand Foch
- Preceded by: Robert Nivelle
- Succeeded by: Auguste Hirschauer

Commander of the Allied Army of the Orient
- In office 15 December 1917 – 17 June 1918
- President: Raymond Poincaré
- Minister of War: Georges Clemenceau
- Chief of Staff: Ferdinand Foch
- Preceded by: Maurice Sarrail
- Succeeded by: Louis Franchet d'Espèrey

Commander of the 5th Army
- In office 7 October – 11 November 1918
- President: Raymond Poincaré
- Minister of War: Georges Clemenceau
- Chief of Staff: Ferdinand Foch
- Preceded by: Henri Berthelot
- Succeeded by: Victor Bourret (1940)

Commander-in-Chief of the Allied occupation forces in the Rhineland
- In office 11 October 1924 – 30 June 1930
- Chairman: Paul Tirard
- Preceded by: Henri Mordacq
- Succeeded by: Military occupation dissolved

Marie Louis Adolphe Guillaumat (English: /ɡiːjoʊˈmɑː/ GEE-yo-MAH, French: [maʁi lwi adɔlf ɡijomɑ]; 4 January 1863 – 18 May 1940) was a French Army general during World War I.

== Early years ==
Adolphe Guillaumat was born in Bourgneuf, Charente-Maritime. He graduated first from his class of 1884 at the Saint-Cyr military academy.

== Career ==
His early career was partly spent in the French Colonies (Algeria, Tunisia, Tonkin, China). He was appointed a sub-lieutenant of infantry in October 1884. Four years later he was promoted lieutenant. In November 1893 he became a captain and was transferred to the 147th infantry regiment. In 1903 he was appointed professor of military history at St. Cyr, and later became lecturer on infantry tactics at the École de Guerre. He was promoted lieutenant-colonel in 1907 and colonel in 1910. In January 1913, he was appointed director of infantry, and obtained the rank of brigadier general in October of that year.

=== World War I ===
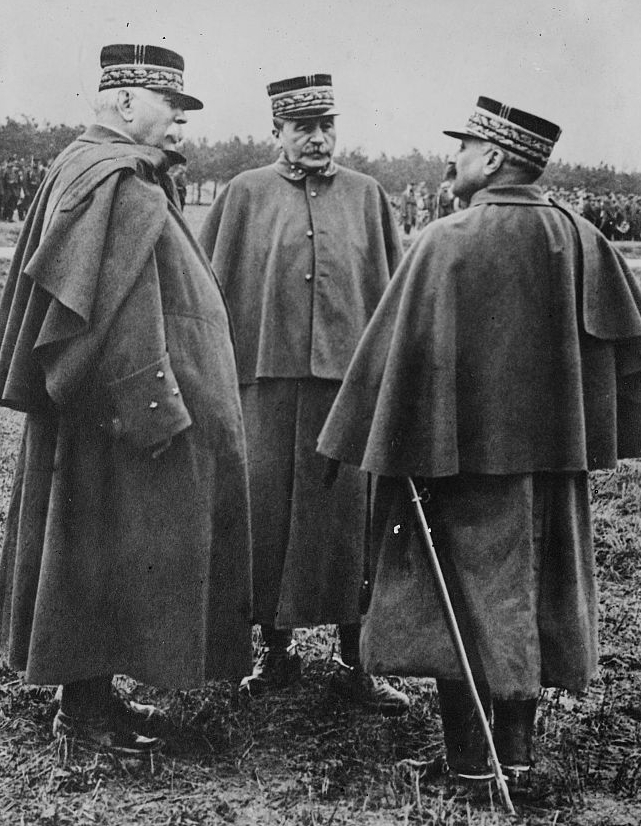
Adolphe Guillaumat (right), with Fernand de Langle de Cary (center) and Joseph Joffre

At the start of World War I, he was chief of Minister of War Adolphe Messimy's military cabinet. When the latter left office, Guillaumat was appointed as the head of the 33rd Infantry Division on 30 August 1914, and then of the 4th Infantry Division on 9 December 1914. He led the 1st Army Corps from 25 February 1915, and on 15 December 1916 he replaced Robert Nivelle as commander of the Second Army, when the latter was made commander-in-chief of the French Army.

Guillaumat was sent to replace General Sarrail as commander of the Allied Army of the Orient in Salonika in December 1917. He laid the plans later executed by his replacement, General Franchet d'Esperey, and rebuilt the relations with France's allies somewhat damaged by his predecessor. Guillaumat was recalled to Paris on 17 June 1918 and replaced with Franchet d'Esperey.

There, he replaced Auguste Dubail as military governor of Paris. After the success of the Second Battle of the Marne, he was appointed to the Supreme War Council. He then returned to active command as commander of the Fifth Army, which he led through the Ardennes at the end of the war.

=== Occupation of the Rhine ===
Following the Armistice, Guillaumat was appointed commander in chief of Allied occupation forces in the Rhineland. He was criticised for his failure to take suitable precaution against cold weather in the winter of 1928/1929 which led to some of the soldiers under his command freezing to death.

=== Political career ===
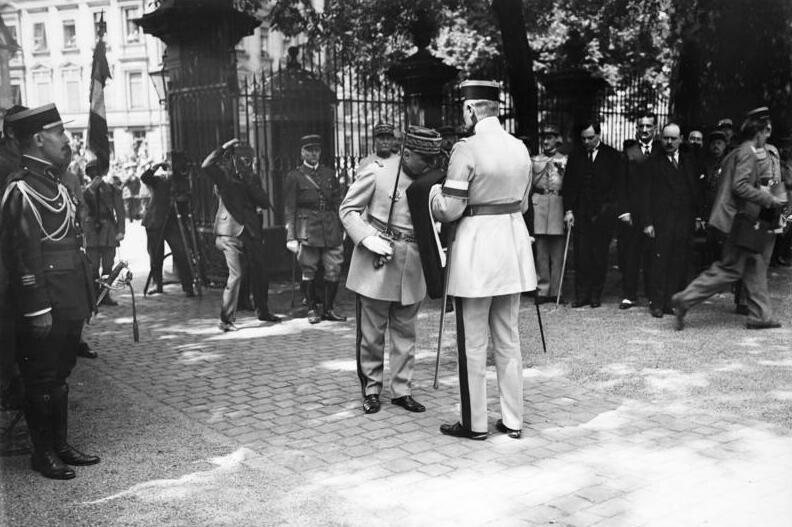
General Adolphe Guillaumat with the French flag in front of the Deutschhaus Mainz 11:30 30 June 1930

He was a minister of war in a short-lived (June–July 1926) government led by Aristide Briand, who had been one year his senior at the Nantes Lycée.

== Personal life ==
Adolphe Guillaumat married Louise Bibent from Toulouse on 17 July 1906 and had two sons: Louis, who became an ophthalmologist, and Pierre, who became a civil servant and served as a minister of the armies of General De Gaulle after the latter's return to power from 1 June 1958 to 5 February 1960.

General Guillaumat was a practising Catholic and an admirer of Frédéric Bastiat.

== Bibliography ==
- Edmonds, J. E. (1987) [1944]. The Occupation of the Rhineland, 1918–1929. History of the Great War Based on Official Documents by Direction of the Historical Section of the Committee of Imperial Defence. orig. For Official Use Only (Imperial War Museum facsimile ed.). HMSO. ISBN 978-0-11-290454-0.
- Pawley, Margaret (2007). The Watch on the Rhine: The Military Occupation of the Rhineland, 1918–1930. I. B. Tauris. ISBN 978-1-84511-457-2.
