= Edmond Buat =

French Army general

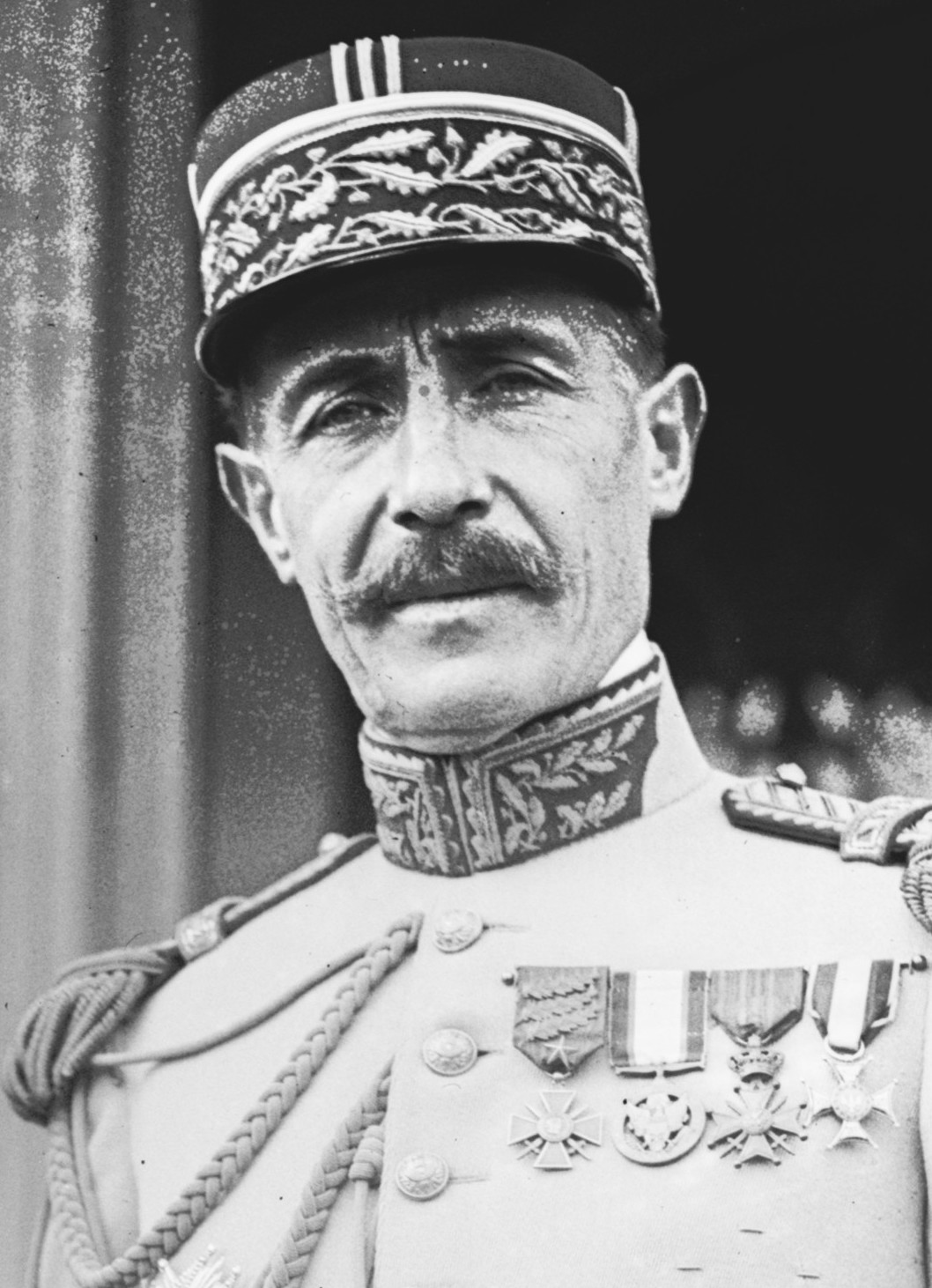
- General Buat in 1921

28th Chief of the Army Staff of France
- In office 25 January 1920 – 30 December 1923
- President: Paul Deschanel; Alexandre Millerand
- Prime Minister: Alexandre Millerand; Georges Leygues; Aristide Briand; Raymond Poincaré
- Minister of War: André Lefèvre; Flaminius Raiberti; Louis Barthou; André Maginot
- Preceded by: Henri Alby
- Succeeded by: Eugène Debeney

5th Commander of the 5th Army
- In office 10 June – 5 July 1918
- President: Raymond Poincaré
- Minister of War: Georges Clemenceau
- Chief of Staff: Ferdinand Foch
- Preceded by: Joseph Alfred Micheler
- Succeeded by: Henri Mathias Berthelot

27th Commander of the 17th Army Corps
- In office 29 March – 10 June 1918
- President: Raymond Poincaré
- Minister of War: Georges Clemenceau
- Chief of Staff: Ferdinand Foch
- Preceded by: Jean César Graziani
- Succeeded by: Henri Claudel

23rd Commander of the 33rd Infantry Division
- In office 28 February – 30 March 1918
- President: Raymond Poincaré
- Minister of War: Georges Clemenceau
- Chief of Staff: Ferdinand Foch
- Preceded by: Auguste-Joseph Eon
- Succeeded by: Albert Tanant

30th Commander of the 2nd Army Corps
- In office 29 December 1916 – 2 January 1917
- President: Raymond Poincaré
- Minister of War: Hubert Lyautey
- Chief of Staff: Robert Nivelle
- Preceded by: Denis Auguste Duchêne
- Succeeded by: Henri Marie Alfred de Cadoudal

2nd Commander of the 121st Infantry Division
- In office 18 June – 29 December 1916
- President: Raymond Poincaré
- Minister of War: Pierre Roques; Hubert Lyautey
- Chief of Staff: Joseph Joffre; Robert Nivelle
- Preceded by: Amédée Henri Guillemin
- Succeeded by: Antoine Targe

Personal details
- Born: 17 September 1868 Châlons-sur-Marne, French Empire
- Died: 30 December 1923 (aged 55) Paris, French Republic
- Spouse: Jeanne Louise Caroline Bubbe
- Parents: Léon Aubin Célestin Buat (father); Marie Poincelet (mother)

Military service
- Allegiance: (France) Third Republic
- Branch/service: French Army: Artillery
- Years of service: 1889 – 1923
- Rank: Division general
- Unit: List: 12th Artillery Regiment; 20th Artillery Regiment; 25th Artillery Regiment
- Commands: List: 121st Infantry Division; 2nd Corps; 33rd Infantry Division; 17th Corps; 5th Army
- Battles/wars: First World War

Edmond Alphonse Léon Buat (17 September 1868 – 30 December 1923) was a general in the French Army, who served as Chief of the Army Staff from 25 January 1920 until his death.

== World War I ==
In World War I, Buat commanded first the 121st Infantry division and then the 2nd Army Corps. In January 1917, he became the head of the General Reserve of the Artillery. From February 1918, he commanded successively the 33rd Infantry division, the 17th Army Corps and from 12 June, the 5th Army.

== Chief of Staff ==
Buat was appointed Chief of the Army Staff on 25 January 1920, and attended the first meeting of Conseil supérieur de la guerre following the armistice on 31 January. When asked by Alexandre Millerand whether the French Army had the capacity to occupy the Ruhr he replied that this would only be possible by mobilising the reserves.

== Death ==
He was buried in the Cemetery Miséricorde, Nantes. On 10 July 1927 Petain, Alexandre Millerand and Ragueneau attended the inauguration of a monument to Buat in Nantes.

== Publications ==
He wrote several books on military history specialising in artillery tactics:

- Un voyage d'état-major de corps d'armée, (with General Henri de Lacroix), Paris, R. Chapelot, 1908.
- Étude critique d'histoire militaire. 1809, de Ratisbonne à Znaïm, deux volumes, Paris, R. Chapelot, 1909, republished Paris, Teissèdre, 2008.
- L'Artillerie de campagne : son histoire, son évolution, son état actuel, Paris, Félix Alcan, coll. «Nouvelle collection scientifique», 1911.
- Les Méthodes de tir de la batterie d'infanterie, M. Imhaus et R. Chapelot, 1911, new edition, 1912.
- Procédés de commandement du groupe de batteries sur le champ de bataille, Paris, R. Chapelot, 1912.
- La Lutte d'artillerie et les méthodes de tir de la contre-batterie, Paris, M. Imhaus et R. Chapelot, 1912.
- La Concentration allemande d'après un document trouvé dans un compartiment de chemin de fer, Paris, R. Chapelot, 1914 (published anonymously)
- L'Armée allemande pendant la guerre de 1914-1918, grandeur et décadence, manœuvres en lignes intérieures, Paris, Chapelot, 1920 (German translation: Die Deutsche Armee im Weltkriege, ihre Grösse und ihr Verfall, ihr Manöverieren auf der inneren Linie. Herausgegeben und übersetzt von Hans Krause, Munich, Wieland Verlag, 1921).
- Ludendorff, Paris, Chapelot, 1921.
- La Prise de Loivre par le 3e Battalion du 133e (16 avril 1917), Paris, Chapelot, 1922.
- Hindenburg et Ludendorff stratèges, Paris, Berger-Levrault, 1923.

His journal, Journal du général Edmond Buat 1914-1923 was published posthumously by the French Ministry of Defense in 2015.

== Promotions ==
- 14 April 1916: Brigadier-General on a temporary basis
- 29 December 1916: Divisional General on a temporary basis
- 31 December 1916: Brigadier-General confirmed
- 24 September 1918: General of division confirmed
