= 2nd Army Corps (France) =

2^{e} Corps d'Armée
- Active: 1914–1918; 23 August 1939 – 26 May 1940; 16 August 1943 – 30 April 1946; Cold War – 1990s
- Country: France
- Branch: French Army
- Type: Corps
- Engagements: World War I World War II

Commanders
- Notable commanders: Edgard de Larminat; Joseph de Goislard de Monsabert

The 2nd Army Corps (French: 2^{e} Corps d'Armée) was first formed before World War I. During World War II it fought in the Campaign for France in 1940 and during the 1944–45 campaigns in southern France, the Vosges Mountains, Alsace, and southwestern Germany. It was active under the First Army for many years after World War II.

== Napoleonic Wars ==
II Corps
- Active: 1805–1807; 1812–1814; 1815
- Country: First French Empire
- Branch: French Imperial Army
- Size: Corps
- Engagements: War of the Third Coalition; Russian Campaign; War of the Sixth Coalition; War of the Seventh Coalition

Commanders
- Notable commanders: Jean-Baptiste Bessières; Jean Lannes; Auguste de Marmont; Nicolas Oudinot; Claude Victor-Perrin; Honoré Charles Reille; Jean Reynier; Jean-de-Dieu Soult

The II Corps of the Grande Armée was a French military unit that existed during the Napoleonic Wars. At its formation in 1805, General Auguste de Marmont was appointed commander of the II Corps.

Batavian Division, commanding officer Général de Division Count Jean-Baptiste Dumonceau

- 1st Batavian Dragoon Regiment (2 Squadrons)
- 1st Batavian Hussar Regiment (2 Squadrons)
- 1st & 2nd Battalions, 1st Batavian Regiment
- 1st & 2nd Battalions, 2nd Batavian Regiment
- 1st & 2nd Battalions, 6th Batavian Regiment
- 1st & 2nd Battalions, Waldeck Regiment
- 1st Battalion, 1st Batavian Light Regiment
- 2nd Battalion, 2nd Batavian Light Regiment
- 1st Foot Artillery

=== War of the Third Coalition ===
The corps participated in the Ulm campaign before advancing southeast to serve as a flank guard. Still under Marmont, the troops then served as the garrison of the Illyrian Provinces until 1809 when they became the Army of Dalmatia and later XI Corps.

=== War of the Fifth Coalition ===
Meanwhile, a parallel II Corps was created in 1809 to fight against Austria. The formation was led first by Marshal Nicolas Oudinot, then by Marshal Jean Lannes who was fatally wounded at Aspern-Essling. Oudinot then took over II Corps again and won his marshal's baton at Wagram in July 1809.

==== Order of battle, 1809 ====
Order of battle in 1809 during the Peninsular War
- Commanding General, Maréchal Jean-de-Dieu Soult
- Corps Artillery
  - 1^{er}, 10^{éme} Compagnies du {3^{éme} Régiment d'Artillerie à Pied
  - 6^{éme} Compagnie du 3^{éme} Régiment d'Artillerie à Cheval
  - 1^{er}, 3^{éme}, et 4^{éme} Compagnies du 6^{éme} (part) Bataillon du Train
  - 9^{éme} Artisan Compagnie d'Artillerie
- 1st Division, commanded by Général de Division Pierre Hugues Victoire Merle
  - 1st Brigade
    - 1^{er}, 2^{e}, and 3^{e} Bataillons du 15^{éme} Régiment d'Infanterie de Ligne
    - 1^{er}, 2^{e}, 3^{e}, and 4^{e} Bataillons du 4^{éme} Régiment d'Infanterie Légère
  - 2nd Brigade
    - 1^{er}, 2^{e}, and 3^{e} Bataillons du 36^{éme} Régiment d'Infanterie de Ligne
    - 1^{er}, 2^{e}, 3^{e}, and 4^{e} Bataillons du 2^{éme} Régiment d'Infanterie de Ligne
  - Divisional Artillery
    - 15^{éme} Compagnie du 3^{éme} Régiment d'Artillerie à Pied
    - (detachment) 1^{er} Compagnie du 3^{éme} Régiment d'Artillerie à Pied
    - 2^{éme} Escadron du Train d'Artillerie de la Garde Imperiale
    - 5^{éme} Compagnie du 6^{éme} (part) Bataillon du Train
    - (detachment) Train d'Artillerie de la Garde Imperiale
- 2nd Division, commanded by Général de Division Julien Augustin Joseph Mermet
  - 1st Brigade
    - Bataillon du Paris
    - 1^{er} Batiallon du 2^{éme} Régiment d'Infanterie de Ligne
    - 2^{éme} Bataillon du 3^{éme} Régiment d'Infanterie de Ligne
    - 3^{éme} Bataillon du 4^{éme} Régiment d'Infantertie de Ligne
    - 1^{er}, 2^{e}, and 3^{e} Bataillons du 31^{éme} Régiment d'Infanterie Légère
  - 2nd Brigade
    - 1^{er}, 2^{e}, 3^{e}, and 4^{e} Bataillons du 47^{éme} Régiment d'Infanterie de Ligne
    - 1^{er}, 2^{e}, 3^{e}, and 4^{e} Bataillons du 122^{éme} Régiment d'Infanterie de Ligne (from 1st and 2nd Reserve Legions)
  - Divisional Artillery
    - 15^{e} and 20^{éme} Compagnies du 3^{éme} Régiment d'Artillerie à Pied
    - 3^{e} and 5^{e} Compagnies du 6^{éme} (part) Bataillon du Train
- 3rd Division, commanded by Général de Division Jean-Pierre-François, Comte Bonet
  - 1st Brigade
    - 119^{éme} Régiment d'Infanterie de Ligne (formed in Spain)
    - 120^{éme} Régiment d'Infanterie de Ligne (formed in Spain)
  - Divisional Artillery
    - 7^{éme} Compagnie du 3^{éme} Régiment d'Artillerie à Cheval
    - 20^{éme} Compagnie du 3^{éme} Régiment d'Artillerie à Pied
    - (detachment) Train d'Artillerie de la Garde Imperiale
- 4th Division, commanded by Général de Division Henri François Delaborde
  - 1st Brigade
    - 1^{er}, 2^{e}, and 3^{e} Bataillons du 70^{éme} Régiment d'Infanterie de Ligne
    - 1^{er}, 2^{e}, and 3^{e} Bataillons du 86^{éme} Régiment d'Infanterie de Ligne
  - 2nd Brigade
    - 4^{éme} Bataillon du 15^{éme} Régiment d'Infanterie Légère
  - Divisional Artillery
    - 8^{éme} Compagnie du 3^{éme} Régiment d'Artillerie à Pied
    - Staff, 1^{er}, 5^{e}, and 6^{e} Compagnies du 11^{éme} Principle Train d'Artillerie
- 1st Cavalry Division, commanded by Général de Division Armand Lebrun de La Houssaye
  - 1st Brigade
    - 1^{er}, 2^{e}, and 3^{e} Escadrons du 17^{éme} Régiment de Dragons
    - 1^{er}, 2^{e}, and 3^{e} Escadrons du 27^{éme} Régiment de Dragons
  - 2nd Brigade
    - 1^{er}, 2^{e}, and 3^{e} Escadrons du 18^{éme} Régiment de Dragons
    - 1^{er}, 2^{e}, and 3^{e} Escadrons du 19^{éme} Régiment de Dragons
- 2nd Cavalry Division, commanded by Général de Division Jean Thomas Guillaume Lorge
  - 1st Brigade
    - 1^{er}, 2^{e}, 3^{e}, and 4^{e} Escadrons du 13^{éme} Régiment de Dragons
    - 1^{er}, 2^{e}, 3^{e}, and 4^{e} Escadrons du 22^{éme} Régiment de Dragons
  - 2nd Brigade
    - 1^{er}, 2^{e}, 3^{e}, and 4^{e} Escadrons du 15^{éme} Régiment de Dragons
    - 1^{er}, 2^{e}, 3^{e}, and 4^{e} Escadrons du 25^{éme} Régiment de Dragons
  - Divisional Artillery
    - 4^{éme} Compagnie du 6^{éme} Régiment d'Artillerie à Pied
    - 9^{éme} Principle Bataillon Train

=== Russian campaign ===
Still commanded by Oudinot, the corps took part in the invasion of Russia in 1812, at which point its size was roughly 40,000 men.

6th Division (Legrand)

- Joseph Jean-Baptiste Albert Brigade
  - 26th Light Infantry Regiment (4 battalions)
- Moreau Brigade
  - 56th Line Infantry Regiment (4 battalions)
- Nicolas Joseph Maison Brigade
  - 19th Line Infantry Regiment (4 battalions)
- Pamplona Brigade
  - 128th Line Infantry Regiment (2 battalions)
  - 3rd Portuguese Regiment (2 battalions)

8th Division Jean-Antoine Verdier

- Raymond-Vivies Brigade
  - 11th Light Infantry Regiment (4 battalions)
  - 2nd Line Infantry Regiment (5 battalions)
- Pouget Brigade
  - 37th Line Infantry Regiment (4 battalions)
  - 124th Line Infantry Regiment (3 battalions)

9th Division (Swiss) Pierre Hugues Victoire Merle

- François Pierre Joseph Amey Brigade
  - 4th Swiss Regiment (3 battalions)
  - 3rd Provisional Croatian Regiment (2 battalions)
- Condras Brigade
  - 1st Swiss Regiment (2 battalions)
  - 2nd Swiss Regiment (3 battalions)
- Coustard Brigade
  - 3rd Swiss Regiment (3 battalions)
  - 123rd Line Infantry Regiment (4 battalions)

Corps Cavalry

- Bertrand Pierre Castex Brigade
  - 23rd Chasseurs-à-Cheval Regiment (4 squadrons)
  - 24th Chasseurs-à-Cheval Regiment (4 squadrons)
- Jean-Baptiste Juvénal Corbineau Brigade
  - 7th Chasseurs-à-Cheval Regiment (4 squadrons)
  - 20th Chasseurs-à-Cheval Regiment (4 squadrons)
  - 8th Chevau-Légers-Lanciers (4 squadrons)

=== War of the Sixth Coalition ===
The II Corps was reorganized in Germany in 1813, with Marshal Claude Victor-Perrin appointed to lead it.

=== War of The Seventh Coalition ===
The corps was headed by General Honoré Charles Reille in 1815 and took part in the Battle of Waterloo.

== World War I ==
2^{e} Corps was one of five corps of the Fifth Army and upon mobilization consisted of the 3rd and 4th Infantry Divisions. 2^{e} Corps headquarters in 1914 was in Amiens. Commanders were:

- At mobilization: Gen. Gérard
- 24 Jul 1915: Gen. Herr
- 10 Aug 1915: Gen. Duchêne
- 29 Dec 1916: Gen. Buat
- 2 Jan 1917: Gen. Cadoudal
- 11 Jun 1918: Gen. Philipot

2^{e} Corps received credit for participation in these battles:

- Aug 1914: Battle of the Ardennes
- Aug 1914: Battle of the Meuse
- Sep 1914: Battle of the Marne
- Sep 1914: Battle of Vitry
- Feb 1915: First battle of Champagne
- Apr 1915: First battle of Woëvre
- Feb 1916: Battle of Verdun
- Jul 1916: Battle of the Somme
- May 1918: Third battle of the Aisne
- Jun 1918: Battle of Matz
- Jul 1918: Second battle of the Marne
- Sep 1918: Battle of Champagne and the Argonne

== World War II ==
In 1940, the 2^{e} Corps d'Armée Motorisé was one of three corps of the Ninth Army and consisted of the 4th Light Cavalry Division and 5th Motorized Division. During the Battle of France, its commander general Jean Bouffet was killed and after the French capitulation, the Corps was dissolved on 26 May 1940.

After Operation Torch, the French troops in North Africa joined the allies, and a new 2nd Army Corps was created in Algeria on 16 August 1943. In November 1943, units of the 2nd Army Corps were used to create the French Expeditionary Corps (1943–44), which fought in Italy.
In September 1944, the 2nd Army Corps landed in the Provence and later liberated Lyon, Autun, Dijon and Chaumont. After having taken over the Vosges and Alsace, the 2nd Army Corps victoriously defended Strasbourg against the German counter-attack in January 1945. In April and May the Corps took part in the German campaign and captured Stuttgart.

In 1944–45, the 2nd Army Corps was subordinated to the First Army. During the campaigns in France and Germany, many divisions served with the corps but the 1st March Infantry Division, the 3rd Algerian Infantry Division, and the 9th Colonial Infantry Division spent several months under 2nd Army Corps command.

The 10th Infantry Division spent its last active months in the French occupation zone in Germany under the command of the 2nd Army Corps.

=== commanders ===
- general Edgard de Larminat (16.08.1943 – 31.08.1944)
- general Joseph de Goislard de Monsabert (31.08.1944 - 24.07.1945)

== Cold War ==
2nd Army Corps major unit locations in 1985
Source: Isby and Kamps, p. 128

In 1984-5 and 1989, 2nd Army Corps was headquartered in Baden-Baden, Germany, and controlled the 3rd and 5th Armored Divisions, as well as the 15th Infantry Division.

Corps troops in 1985 included 32 and 74 Regiments de Artillerie, with the Pluton SSM; two regiments of 155mm self-propelled guns; a target acquisition regiment; 51 and 53 Regiments de Artillerie with Roland; two regiments of engineers; 3e Regiment de Hussards, a reconnaissance unit; and two helicopter units.

Major General Sengeisen (Jean, Pierre) was appointed Deputy General Commanding the 2nd Army Corps and Commander-in-Chief of the French forces in Germany as of October 1, 1991.

The corps was disestablished on 31 August 1993 at a ceremony at Puységur, Oos, Baden-Württemberg, a part of Baden-Baden. The last commander was General Michel Cavaillé.

With the end of the Cold War, the French Army underwent significant reorganization and no longer has any numbered corps headquarters.

== See also ==
- 1st Army Corps (France) also part of the French First army during World War II
