= Louis Loyzeau de Grandmaison =

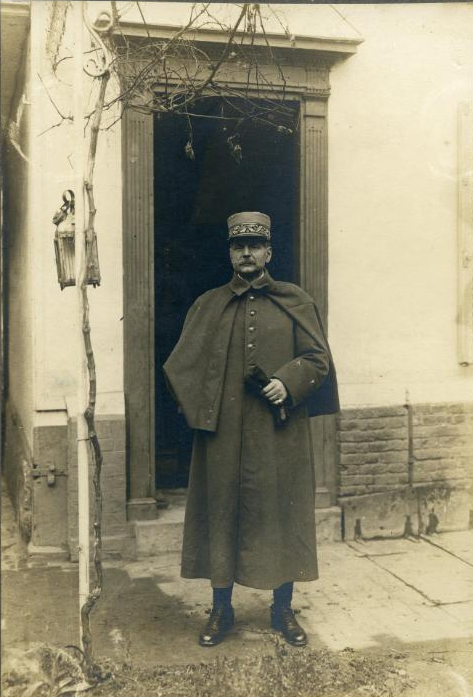
Louis Loyzeau

Louis Loyzeau de Grandmaison (21 January 1861 – 18 February 1915) was a French military theorist who, in an atmosphere of revanchism, linked the humiliating defeat of the Franco-Prussian War to the French having ceased utilizing Napoleonic methods. De Grandmaison argued for rapid maneuvers by large formations engaging in swift attacks. The school of thought he subscribed to dominated French army thinking by 1914, but in a modified form which combined the contemporaneous philosophy of Élan vital. In the end, such theories proved inadequate against modern weapons and tactics.

He was killed in action in 1915. He was a member of Nichan Iftikhar (Order of Glory), a Tunisian honorary order.

== Career and political background ==
Commissioned in 1883, de Grandmaison served in light, mountain, and Foreign Legion infantry units before—benefiting from meritocratic promotion—he was admitted on a course to qualify as a staff officer. He was a favourite pupil of Ferdinand Foch, who characterised war as a battle of the will. Assigned to the General Staff in 1906, he began building on Foch's ideas with intensified emphasis on operational mobility and seizing the initiative.

The French army rifle was the Lebel Model 1886 rifle with a 20 ½ inch bayonet. German heavy guns had been unveiled in 1900, but under the influence of Hippolyte Langlois France had concentrated on mobile shrapnel firing Canon de 75 modèle 1897 with a flat trajectory that left crews exposed instead of the high explosive lobbing howitzers. In 1911 French army chief Victor-Constant Michel proposed returning to the established pattern of French army plans for defensive strategy in a war with Germany. He proposed deploying a million-strong French army on a line Verdun-Namur-Antwerp to counter the anticipated German offensive. In order to field an army of this size French reserve units would need to be integrated with the active army immediately on mobilisation. Michel had presciently identified where the German attack was to come three years later, but he ran afoul of the regular army contempt for reserve officers, and politicians who wanted to recover France's lost provinces. The fortresses that were to bear the brunt of a German attack were garrisoned by low quality reservist units, because the High Command considered use of regular troops on non-offensive assignments as redundant.

Using the controversy to discredit what he saw as conservative opposition to the new aggressive style of waging war, operations director Lt Col de Grandmaison published a book including two of his lectures to officers of the General Staff that could be read as advocating headstrong all out attack, although being to such senior officers the talks had clearly been about handling very large formations. An earlier book of de Grandmaison about infantry tactics written when he was a major did seem to be dismissive of attacks not made with the bayonet.

The reaction to de Grandmaison's intervention was entirely favourable and Michel, who had advocated economy of force holding action along the border with Alsace and Lorraine, was dismissed and replaced as French army chief of staff by the offensive minded Joseph Joffre, who bought in new regulations mandating commanders to privilege the offensive. He also charged Plan XVII to incorporate an immediate French invasion of Alsace-Lorraine. Joffre was strongly supported by Raymond Poincaré as President of the Republic, his election in 1913, had been helped by two million francs in Russian bribes to the French press. Poincaré anticipated war in two years and announced that his entire effort was to prepare for it.

Explaining the 1870 defeat of France as the result of its drift towards a spirit of defence started to be presented as a way of winning back the lost provinces through overcoming modern long range rifle and artillery fire by will and elan. Thus corrupted, his teachings were taken up with alacrity and had become received wisdom in the French army by late 1911, when de Grandmaison was rewarded with promotion to colonel and command of the crack 153rd regiment. A hoax by Edmond Buat (who falsely claimed to have found the German war plan under his seat on a train) was widely accepted, and the French line along the Belgian frontier was denuded by Joffre at the beginning of hostilities.

== First World War ==
In the fighting of August 1914 de Grandmaison was wounded three times in 24 hours. The huge casualties and lack of gains during the early months of the First World War resulting from crude offensive à outrance attacks on Lorraine created a pessimistic climate of public opinion, while the deaths of so many of the army's best and most determined young officers had lasting deleterious effects. Apologists for Joffre's botched dispositions in the first month of the war pointed to him lacking useful intelligence on the intentions of Germany toward Verdun, but Michel had been sacked for a proposal to defend Verdun that correctly anticipated the Schlieffen Plan.

While now often seen as having been a disastrous misstep in tactical doctrine, the pre war reforms de Grandmaison was at least spokesman for have been given credit for being instrumental in swift operational level movement of reserves to meet German offensives, and so the doctrine's effect may have been somewhat ambiguous. Another defence of de Grandmaison is his General Staff lectures were taken as applying to the company level which they could hardly have been to such senior officers, he was not of sufficient rank to implement those views, and him being dead made him an ideal scapegoat. In January 1915 de Grandmaison's post-1911 meteoric ascent continued when he received promotion to General de Division (equivalent to the Anglophone rank of Major General), being given command of the Fifth Army Reserve group. He was killed in action the next month.
