= Le Souvenir français =

Le Souvenir français is a French association for maintaining war memorials and war memory, comparable to the Commonwealth War Graves Commission.

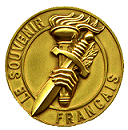

It was created in 1887 in the departments of Alsace and Lorraine. Young women in traditional dress had been furtively placing cockades on soldiers' tombs. An Alsatian professor, Xavier Niessen, against Prussian orders in these departments, was keen to show his membership of the French fatherland and thought that remembering those who had died for France allowed the feeling of national unity to be maintained. Thus, on 7 March 1888 he summoned the French to join his new association, which then had a highly active period.

It is one of France's oldest associations d’utilité publique (being recognised as such on 1 February 1906) and has three aims:

- to conserve the memory of those who have died for France
- to maintain memorials to France's war dead
- to hand down the memory of them to future generations

Many of its supporters were mobilised in the First World War, with the remaining ones looking after war graves and accompanying the families of the war dead on visits to them. The association was then in charge of 88,000 burials from the Franco-Prussian War and could only handle 1,700,000 burials of dead from the First World War. Thus the law of 31 July 1920 created the "service national des sépultures", took charge of military cemeteries and organised nationals necropolises. After the Second World War general Lacapelle, president of Le Souvenir Français, demanded the identification of 100,000 French soldiers who had died the battle of France and the maintenance of their tombs.

It has a general delegation by department, around 1,450 local committees in France and 52 foreign delegations. It now has 130,000 active members.
