= Jean-Baptiste Campenon =

French general and politician (1819–1891)

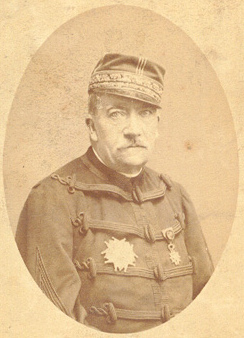
General Jean-Baptiste Campenon

General Jean Baptiste Marie Edouard Campenon (5 May 1819, Tonnerre – 16 March 1891, Neuilly-sur-Seine) was a French general and politician.

== Life ==
He studied at the École spéciale militaire de Saint-Cyr, graduating on 1 October 1840 as a sous-lieutenant. He took part in the Crimean War, the French conquest of Algeria, campaigns in China and the Franco-Prussian War. A friend of Gambetta, he was minister for war several times in 1881, then in 1883 and 1885. He then became a sénateur inamovible. He also secretly translated The Perfumed Garden.

== Bibliography ==
- G. Vapereau, «Campenon, Jean Baptiste Marie Edouard » in Dictionnaire Universel Des Contemporains, Paris : Hachette, 1880. (p. 10) OCLC 36982383

Political offices
Preceded by Jean-Joseph Farre	Minister of War; 14 November 1881 – 26 January 1882	Succeeded by Jean-Baptiste Billot
Preceded by Jean Thibaudin	Minister of War; 9 October 1883 – 3 January 1885	Succeeded by Jules Louis Lewal
Preceded by Jules Louis Lewal	Minister of War; 6 April 1885 – 7 January 1886	Succeeded by Georges Ernest Boulanger
