= Tell Aristide Frédéric Antoine Chapel =

French general (1849–1932)

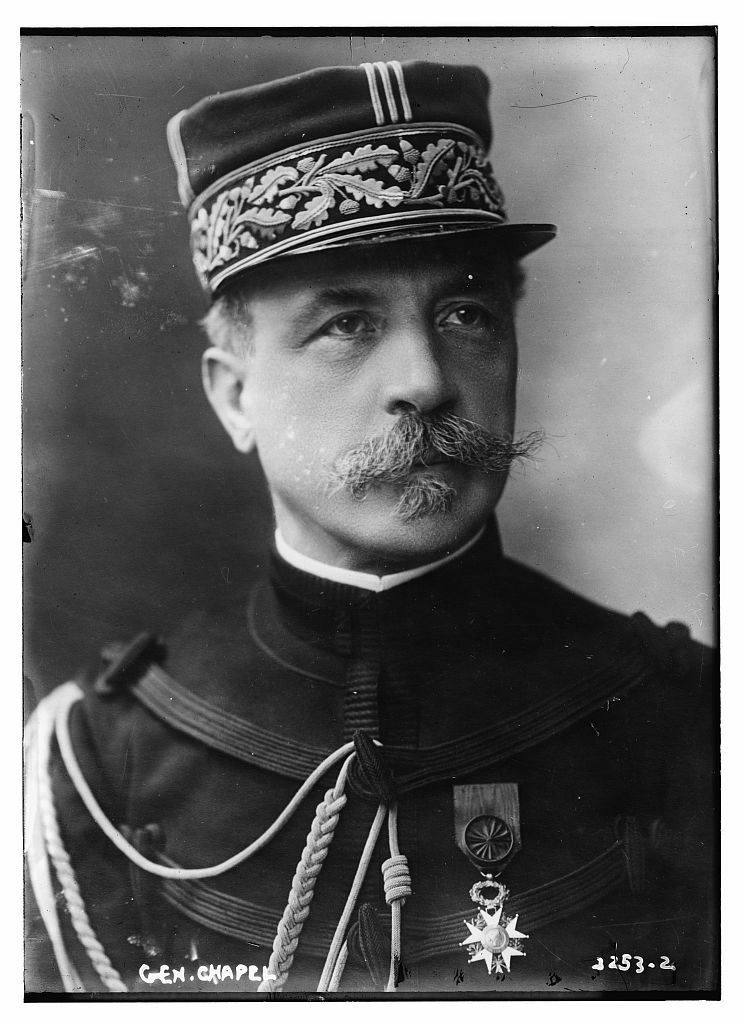

Tell Aristide Frédéric Antoine Chapel (July 1, 1849 – August 11, 1932) was a French General during World War I.
