= 17th Army Corps (France) =

The 17th Army Corps was a French Army corps, which fought in the Franco-Prussian War and both World Wars.

During World War I, 17th Army Corps formed part of the Fourth Army. The 9th Balloon company of the U.S. Army Observation Balloon Service in World War I, served with the corps in 1918.

The corps was mobilized from 9 September 1939 from the 17th Military Region, and fought the unsuccessful fr:Bataille de l'Ailette (1940) against the oncoming German Army. It was stood down and eventually disestablished after the Armistice of 22 June 1940.

== Commanders during World War I and World War II ==
- 21 August 1914 : Noël Dumas
- 20 May 1917 : Paul Prosper Henrys
- 11 December 1917 : Jean César Graziani
- 29 March 1918 : Edmond Buat
- 10 June 1918 : Henri Claudel
- 27 October 1918 - 17 June 1919 : Frédéric Hellot
- 2 September 1939 - 25 June 1940 : Onésime Noël

== Sources ==
- Service historique de l'état-major des armées, Les Armées françaises dans la Grande guerre, Paris, Impr. nationale, 1922–1934, onze tomes subdivisés en 30 volumes (notice BnF no FRBNF41052951) :
  - AFGG, vol. 1, t. 10 : Ordres de bataille des grandes unités : grands quartiers généraux, groupe d'armées, armées, corps d'armée, 1923, 966 p.
- Service historique de l'armée de terre, Inventaire sommaire des archives de la Guerre 1914–1918, Troyes, Imprimerie « la Renaissance », 1969, 691 p., (notice BnF no FRBNF35127448).
- les Grandes Unités Françaises - Histoires Succinctes; Ministère des Armées- État-Major de l'Armée de Terre- Service historique
- https://www.crid1418.org/doc/bdd_cdd/unites/CA17.html
