= Henri Claudel =

French general

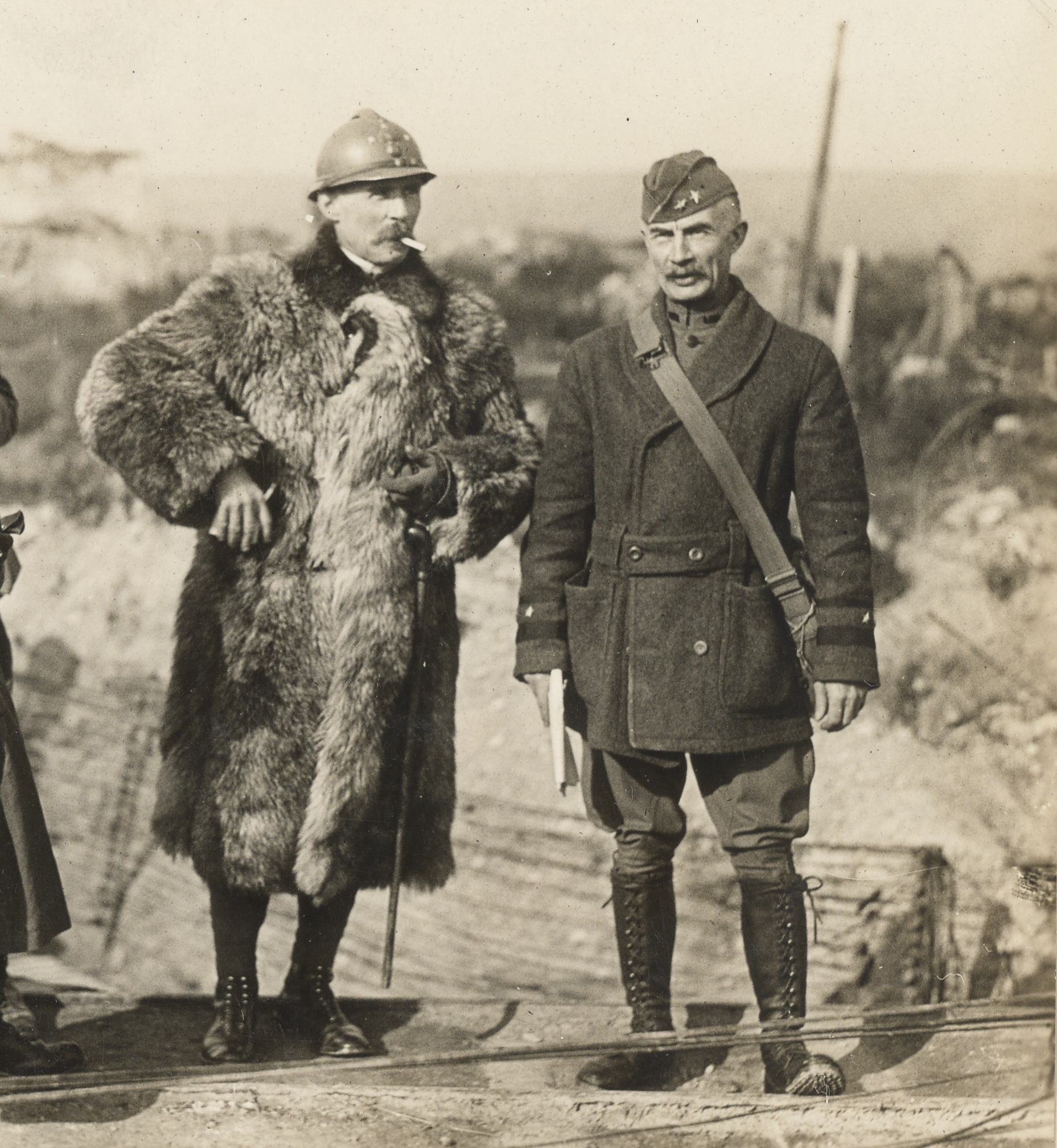
- Henri Claudel (left) conferring with US general Joseph Kuhn in October 1918
- Born: 13 January 1871
- Died: 20 February 1956 (age 85)
- Military career
- Allegiance: France
- Branch: French Colonial Forces
- Service years: To 1936
- Rank: Général de Division

Henri Edouard Claudel (13 January 1871 – 20 February 1956) was a French general.

== Early career and First World War ==
Claudel became a lieutenant-colonel on 24 September 1911, before being assigned to the 3rd Senegalese Tirailleurs regiment on 24 February 1913. He became a knight of the Legion of Honour on 11 May 1913 and was promoted to colonel on 1 November 1914, at the same time receiving command of the 3rd Colonial Infantry Regiment. He was soon after (6 December) posted to command of the 33rd Infantry Regiment before assuming command of the 65th Infantry Brigade on 10 January 1915. On 31 August Claudel became Chief of Staff of the fortress region of Verdun and on 11 October assumed the same role in the Eastern Army Group. He became second aide de camp to the General Staff of the French Army on 22 January 1916 and on 1 October was promoted to Général de Brigade, soon after (28 October) being made an officer of the Legion of Honour. Claudel held the position of second aide de camp to the General Staff of the armies of the north and north-east from 17 December 1916 to 2 May 1917. On 20 May he was placed in command of the 59th Reserve Infantry Division, a post he held until his promotion to Général de Division and commander of the 17th Corps on 10 June 1918.

== Post-war career ==
He remained with 17th Corps beyond the end of the First World War until 1 March 1919 when he was without posting until made commander of the French Army of the East on 20 May. He was released from this role on 8 April 1920, became a commander of the Legion of Honour on 16 June, and was without a position until 12 November when he became a member of the Advisory Committee on Colonial Defence. On 17 March 1922 he was placed in command of the troops in French West Africa, a role he filled until 23 February 1924. On 17 October Claudel was made commander of the French Colonial Corps and from 3 June 1925 to 13 January 1936 was Inspector General of Colonial Troops, a post he held at the same time as chairing the Advisory Committee on Colonial Defence. He became a grand officer of the Legion of Honour on 21 December 1926 and from 5 December 1927 to 13 January 1936 (when he was placed on the reserve list) Claudel was a member of the Supreme Council of War. He received promotion to Grand Cross of the Legion of Honour on 30 December 1933.

== Decorations ==
In addition to holding the rank of Grand Cross of the Legion of Honour Claudel held many military awards and decorations. These included the prestigious Médaille militaire for leadership and the Croix de Guerre, the Médaille Interalliée and Médaille commémorative de la guerre for service in the First World War. He also held the Colonial Medal with clasps for Morocco 1925, Senegal, Ivory Coast, Sudan, French West Africa and Mauritania. Claudel was also recognised with awards from foreign governments including the Croix de Guerre and commander of the Order of Leopold of Belgium, the Distinguished Service Medal of the United States and the Grand Cross of the Order of Ouissam Alaouite of Morocco.
