= Henri Alby =

Former Chief of the Army Staff, France

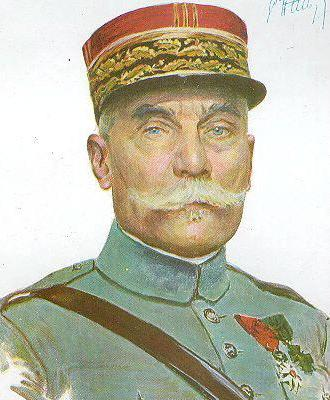
- General Alby in 1918

27th Chief of the Army Staff
- In office 29 December 1918 – 25 January 1920
- Preceded by: Ferdinand Foch
- Succeeded by: Edmond Buat

Personal details
- Born: 5 November 1858 Marseille, French Empire
- Died: 11 February 1935 (aged 76) Toulouse, French Republic
- Spouse: Amélie Jeanne Eugénie de Barrau de Muratel
- Parents: Joseph Marie François Paul Édouard Alby (father); Hortense Françoise Pichaud (mother)

Military service
- Allegiance: (France) Third Republic
- Branch/service: French Army: Infantry
- Years of service: 1878 – 1920
- Rank: Division general
- Battles/wars: First World War

Henri Marie Camille Édouard Alby (5 November 1858 – 11 February 1935) was a French army general who served during the First World War. Following the armistice, he was appointed Chief of the Army Staff.

== Biography ==
Henri was born in Marseille to Joseph Alby and his wife Hortense Pichaud. His brother was engineer Amédée Alby.

In 1878, he started attending the School of Artillery and Engineering at Fontainebleau. After two years, he was commissioned as second lieutenant and assigned to the 1st Engineering Regiment. There, he served for a year before being promoted to lieutenant, and participated to the French conquest of Algeria during the pacification of the territories south of Oran. In 1883, his promotion to captain was followed by an assignment to the Engineering General Staff. He joined the Superior War School for two years in 1885.

On 11 February 1893, he married his cousin Amélie Jeanne Eugénie de Barrau de Muratel. He received the Legion of Honour in July 1895 and was gradually promoted to battalion chief (major) in 1897, lieutenant colonel in 1904 and colonel in 1907.

Henri Alby rose to the rank of brigade general in 1911, then division general in 1915 and was put in charge of the 13th Corps during the First World War.

Alby was awarded the Distinguished Service Medal after the First World War for his services to the American Expeditionary Forces.

Toward the end of the War, Alby was made Major General of the Army Staff and acting Chief of the Army Staff under Ferdinand Foch, who notionally retained that position despite having also become Supreme Allied Commander in March 1918. Alby finally became Chief of the Army Staff in December 1918, a month after the armistice, replacing Marshal Foch who remained Supreme Allied Commander until 1920. His future successor to the position, General Edmond Buat, wrote in his personal journal his dismay over Alby's appointment at the time:

A brave but very poor man. [...] This pale man - trembling reed - is obviously convenient for politicians to whom he says "amen". Neither a leader, nor even a soldier, one can already find it astonishing that, dismissed from an army corps, he was chosen for the rear general staff, then - insanity! - to take the place of Chief of the General Staff. The place of Marshal Foch! It is clear that his occupations have not changed with his title and that he is still doing the same paperwork as before. But for the rest: not so sure!

— Edmond Buat, Journal 1914-1923, pp. 641, 724

== Decorations ==
- Legion of Honour
  - Grand Officer – 10 July 1918
  - Commander – 25 March 1915
  - Officer – 11 July 1912
  - Knight – 9 July 1895
- War Cross 1914–1918
- U.S. Army Distinguished Service Medal

=== Citations ===
For his promotion to Commander of the Legion of Honour :

Showed, in all circumstances, in the command of his division, the rarest and most complete military qualities: method, knowledge and energy which, together with remarkable bravery, enabled him to prepare and bring to fruition the numerous successes he obtained in his sector.

— Journal Officiel de la République Française, 22 April 1915
