= Joseph Jean-Baptiste Albert =

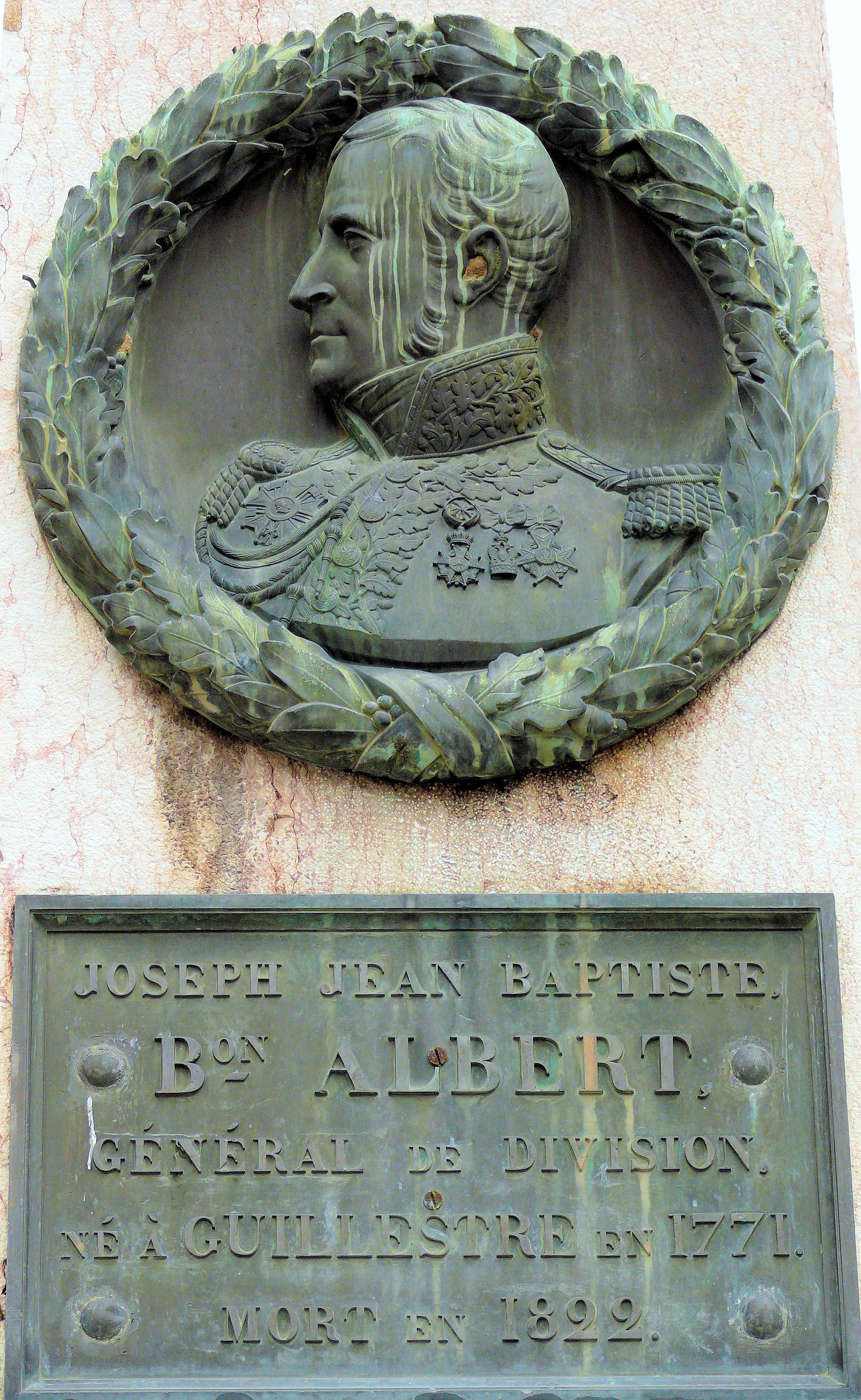
Commemorative plaque of Joseph Jean-Baptiste Albert in Guillestre, France, 2011

Joseph Jean-Baptiste, baron Albert (French pronunciation: [ʒozɛf ʒɑ̃ batist albɛʁ]; 1771 – 1822) was a French general de division (major general). He fought at the Battle of Eylau, the Battle of Aspern-Essling and the Battle of Wagram. He was made a brigadier general in 1807. He was involved in the French invasion of Russia in 1812. He was made a baron of the First French Empire by Napoleon Bonaparte. He was a grand officer of the Legion of Honour and a knight of the Order of Saint Louis.
