= 33rd Infantry Division (France) =

33rd Infantry Division was a French Army infantry division. At the outbreak of World War I it was placed in 17th Army Corps, part of 4th Army.

== Sources ==
- Ministère des Armées, État-Major de l'Armée de Terre, Service Historique, Inventaire sommaire des archives de la Guerre 1914–1918, Imprimerie « LA RENAISSANCE » — TROYES - Dépôt légal : 4e trimestre 1969 — N° 19.982
- AFGG, vol. 2, t. 10 : Ordres de bataille des grandes unités : divisions d'infanterie, divisions de cavalerie, 1924, 1092 p
