= Jules Louis Lewal =

French general

Jules Lewal
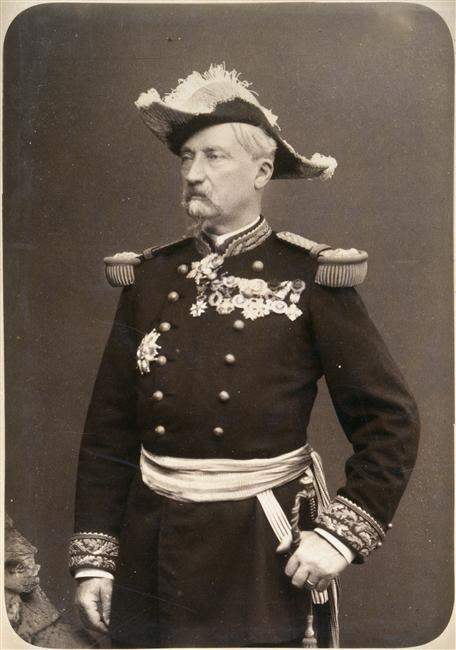

Jules Louis Lewal (13 December 1823 – 22 January 1908) was a French general, who also wrote scripts like Stratégie de combat (translation: Combat strategy).

== Biography ==
He was born in Paris; entered the army in 1846; served in the Italian campaign of 1859, with the French troops in Mexico (1862), and, after cooperation with Adolphe Niel in the army reforms, in the Franco-Prussian War. He was promoted to brigadier general in 1874; became head of the Military Academy three years after.

From January to April 1885, he was Minister of War in Ferry's cabinet. In 1888 was appointed inspector general.

== Writings ==
- La réforme de l'armée (1871)
- Études de guerre (1872 and 1890)
- Tactique (1875–83)
- Stratégie de marche (1893)
- Stratégie de combat (1895 sqq.)

== Notes ==
Political offices
Preceded by Jean-Baptiste Campenon	Minister of War; 3 January-6 April 1885	Succeeded by Jean-Baptiste Campenon
