= Pierre Guillaumat =

Minister of the Armies
- In office 1 June 1958 – 5 February 1960
- President: René Coty; Charles de Gaulle
- Prime Minister: Charles de Gaulle; Michel Debré
- Preceded by: Charles de Gaulle
- Succeeded by: Pierre Messmer

Personal details
- Born: 5 August 1909 La Flèche, France
- Died: 28 August 1991 (aged 82) Villeurbanne, France
- Education: École polytechnique École des Mines de Paris

Pierre Guillaumat (French pronunciation: [pjɛʁ ɡijoma]; 5 August 1909 – 28 August 1991) was a Minister of National Education and Minister of the Armies under French President Charles de Gaulle and founder of the Elf Aquitaine oil company in 1967. He was born in La Flèche, Sarthe, the son of French general Adolphe Guillaumat.

Political offices
Preceded by Louis Joxe	Minister of National Education; 1960–1961	Succeeded by Lucien Paye
Preceded by Charles de Gaulle	Minister of the Armies; 1958–1960	Succeeded by Pierre Messmer
Business positions
Preceded by Roger Gaspard	CEO of Electricité de France; 1964–1965	Succeeded by Pierre Massé
