= Juzennecourt =

- Commune
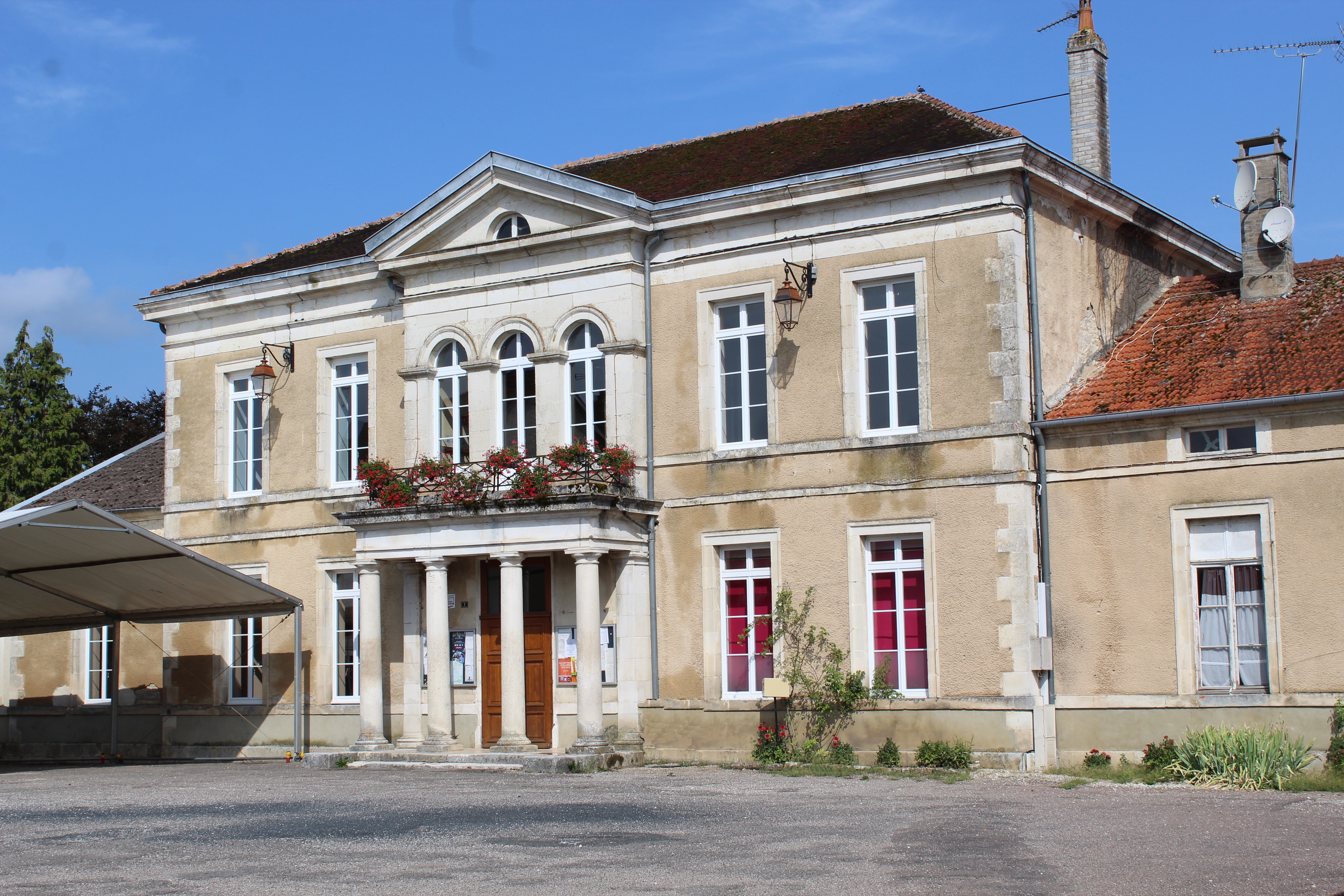
- The town hall in Juzennecourt

- Coat of arms
- Location of Juzennecourt
- Location within France Location within Grand Est
- Coordinates: 48°11′05″N 4°58′48″E
- Country: France
- Region: Grand Est
- Department: Haute-Marne
- Arrondissement: Chaumont
- Canton: Châteauvillain
- Intercommunality: CA Chaumont

Government
  - Mayor (2020–2026): Jean-Marie Watremetz
- Area^{1}: 11.87 km^{2} (4.58 sq mi)
- Elevation: 305 m (1,001 ft)
- Population (2023): 193
  - Density: 16.3/km^{2} (42.1/sq mi)
- Demonym(s): Juzennecourtois, Juzennecourtoises
- Time zone: UTC+01:00 (CET)
  - Summer (DST): UTC+02:00 (CEST)
- INSEE/Postal code: 52253 /52330
- ^{1} French Land Register data, which excludes lakes, ponds, glaciers > 1 km^{2} (0.386 sq mi or 247 acres) and river estuaries.

Juzennecourt (French pronunciation: [ʒyzɛnkuʁ]) is a commune in the Haute-Marne department in north-eastern France.

== Geography ==
The river Blaise flows through the commune.

== See also ==
- Communes of the Haute-Marne department
