= André Joseph Lefèvre =

French politician

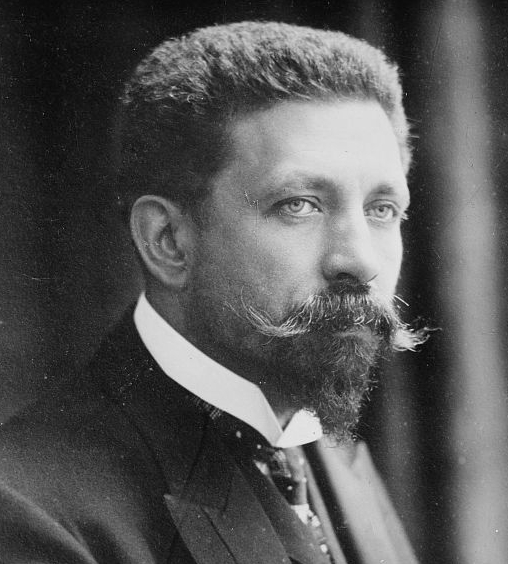

Minister of War
- In office 20 January 1920 – 16 December 1920
- Preceded by: Georges Clemenceau
- Succeeded by: Flaminius Raiberti

Personal details
- Born: 17 June 1869 Paris, France
- Died: 5 November 1929 (aged 60) Paris, France
- Occupation: Engineer, politician

André Joseph Lefèvre (17 June 1869 – 5 November 1929) was a French politician who was Minister of War in 1920.

== Life ==
=== Early years ===
André Joseph Lefèvre was born in Paris on 17 June 1869, son of an engineer who was an inspector for the Compagnie des chemins de fer de l'Est. He attended the Collège Chaptal and then the École des Mines de Paris. He became the secretary of Alfred Joseph Naquet. In 1893 he worked for the candidacy of René Viviani as Deputy in the 5th arrondissement of Paris and began to write for the socialist journal La Petite République. He was elected Municipal Councillor of the Sorbonne district of Paris from 1895 to 1900, and was reelected in 1904. From 1907 to 1908 he was president of the Paris city council, and then was general counsel of the Seine.

=== Deputy ===
Lefèvre ran successfully for election to the chamber of deputies on 24 April 1910 for the first district of Aix-en-Provence, Bouches-du-Rhône. He sat with the socialist republicans. On 3 November 1910 he was appointed Under Secretary of State for Finance in the second cabinet of Aristide Briand. He did little in this capacity and resigned on 3 February 1911. Lefèvre was appointed General Counsel for Bouches-du-Rhône, and wrote for the Le Petit Provençal.

In the general elections of 26 April 1914 Lefèvre retained his seat and joined the Union républicaine radicale et socialiste (Union of Radical and Socialist Republicans). With the outbreak of World War I (1914–18) he was made a temporary Military Engineer (2nd class) and spent the next four years studying the manufacture and use of explosives, munitions and rockets. On 3 September 1918 he filed a patent application for a "shell for firing against armor plating and resisting targets". In the election of 16 November 1919 Lefèvre was at the head of the Republican list and won reelection by an absolute majority. He joined the democratic republican left. He became vice-president of the Chamber of Deputies on 13 January 1920.

== Minister of War ==
Lefèvre was appointed Minister of War on 20 January 1920 in the first cabinet of Alexandre Millerand. The cabinet fell on 18 February 1920 but Lefèvre retained his portfolio in the second Millerand cabinet from 18 February 1920 to 23 September 1920 and in the cabinet of Georges Leygues. On 9 June 1920 Lefèvre told the Senate Committee on the Army of the imminent filing of a project to reorganize the recruitment and staffing of the French army. Most of the deputies and senators were in favor of reducing the length of service, but Lefèvre saw that the Germans were not adhering to the military clauses of the Treaty of Versailles and wanted to retain two years of military service.

In a meeting of 27 October 1920 the Superior Council of National Defense decided unanimously to reduce the term of military service to 18 months. Lefèvre presented the project to the Council of Ministers who approved it on condition that parliament accepted two years of service for a transitional period. On 14 December 1920, when Lefèvre was taking the waters at Vichy, the government submitted the bill on recruitment and reorganization of the army, reducing the number of divisions that could be immediately mobilized. Lefèvre was deeply disappointed and worried by the reductions, and resigned from the cabinet on 16 December 1920.

=== Last years ===
André Lefèvre was reappointed vice-president of the Chamber. He failed to be reelected in the 11 May 1924 general election.

He died in Paris on 5 November 1929 at the age of 60. He had never married. He was a commander of the Legion of Honor.

== Publications ==
- Cadoux, Gaston; Lefèvre, André Joseph (1913). La vie des grandes capitales: etudes comparatives sur Londres-Paris-Berlin-Vienne-Rome. Berger-Levrault & Cie. p. 872.
- André Lefèvre (1920). Instruction provisoire sur l'emploi et la manoeuvre des unités d'autos-mitrailleuses de cavalerie. T. I. 1re partie. Impr. nationale. p. 40.
- André Lefèvre (1926-12-02). "Reichsbank a fait de la fausse monnaie la plus grande escroquerie des temps". Le Figaro.

== Sources ==
- Jolly, Jean (1977). "André, Joseph LEFÈVRE". Dictionnaire des parlementaires français de 1889 à 1940 (in French).
- Metzger, Chantal (September 1999). "L'ALLEMAGNE: UN DANGER POUR LA FRANCE EN 1920?". Guerres mondiales et conflits contemporains (193, Dossier: La France à la recherche de sécurité (1920-1922)). Presses Universitaires de France. JSTOR 25732556.
- "Shell for firing against armor plating and resisting targets: US 1402776 A". Google Patents.
