= Charles Nollet =

French general and government minister

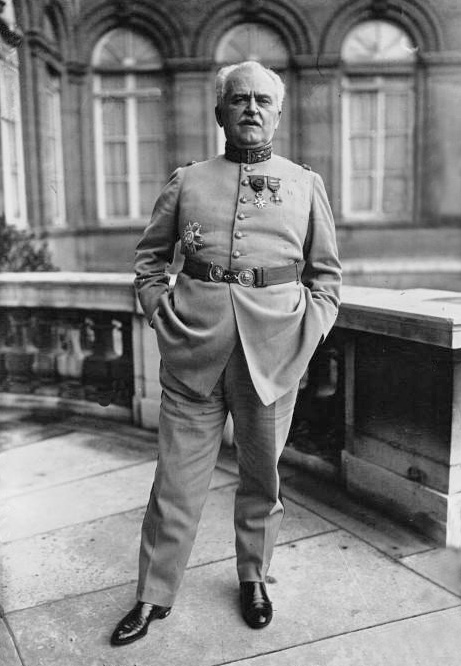
Nollet in 1924

Charles Marie Edouard Nollet (English: /nɒˈleɪ/ no-LAY, French: [ʃaʁl nɔlɛ]; 1865–1941) was a French general and government minister, chairman of the Military Inter-Allied Commission of Control from 1919 to 1924, and Minister of War 1924–1925.

Nollet was born 29 January 1865 at Marseille and died in 1941 at Clermont-Ferrand. He enlisted in the French army in 1884, in 1902 serving as an instructor in a military school. During the First World War be commanded the French 48th Infantry Brigade in 1914, the 66th Infantry Division in 1915, and XII Army Corps in 1916. Following the war, Nollet was Chairman of the Military Inter-Allied Commission of Control. He was appointed to the Supreme War Council in 1921, remaining a member until 1930. Nollet was Minister of War from 14 June 1924 to 16 April 1925 in the first government of Édouard Herriot. He was a Grand Chancellor of the Legion of Honour from 7 January 1934, and was awarded the Médaille militaire in 1928. Nollet died on 28 January 1941 on his 76th birthday.

== Bibliography ==
- Tucker, Spencer; Roberts, Priscilla Mary (2005). The Encyclopedia of World War I: A Political, Social and Military History. Santa Barbara, CA: ABC-CLIO. ISBN 978-1-85-109420-2.
