= Pierre Roques =

Pierre Auguste Roques
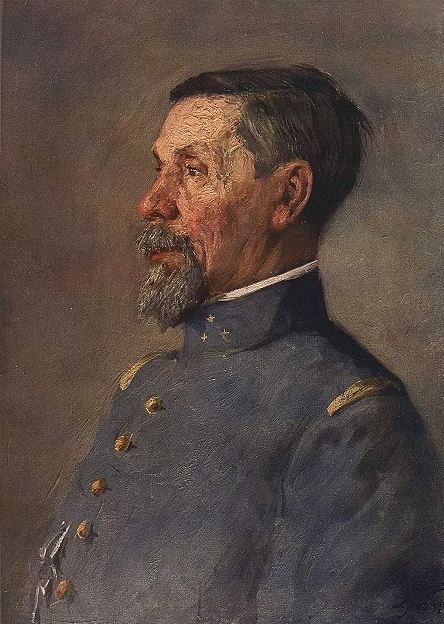
- Portrait published in L'Illustration during the First World War.
- Born: 28 December 1856; Marseillan, Hérault, France
- Died: 26 February 1920 (aged 63); Saint-Cloud, France
- Military career
- Allegiance: France
- Rank: General
- Commands: First Army; Fourth Army
- Conflicts: World War I
- Awards: Grand cross of the Légion d'honneur Médaille militaire

Minister of War of France
- In office 16 March – 12 December 1916
- President: Raymond Poincaré
- Prime Minister: Aristide Briand
- Preceded by: Joseph Gallieni
- Succeeded by: Hubert Lyautey

Commander of the 7th Infantry Division
- In office 9 April 1912 – 18 August 1913
- President: Armand Fallières; Raymond Poincaré
- Minister of War: Alexandre Millerand; Albert Lebrun; Eugène Étienne
- Chief of Staff: Joseph Joffre
- Preceded by: Tell Aristide Frédéric Antoine Chapel
- Succeeded by: Edgard de Trentinian

Commander of the 12th Army Corps
- In office 18 August 1913 – 5 January 1915
- President: Raymond Poincaré
- Minister of War: Eugène Étienne; Joseph Noulens; Théophile Delcassé; Adolphe Messimy; Alexandre Millerand
- Chief of Staff: Joseph Joffre
- Preceded by: Auguste Charles Lucien Pelécier
- Succeeded by: Henri Jean Descoings

Commander of the 1st Army
- In office 5 January 1915 – 16 March 1916
- President: Raymond Poincaré
- Minister of War: Alexandre Millerand; Joseph Gallieni
- Chief of Staff: Joseph Joffre
- Preceded by: Auguste Dubail
- Succeeded by: Olivier Mazel

Commander of the 4th Army
- In office 31 December 1916 – 23 March 1917
- President: Raymond Poincaré
- Minister of War: Hubert Lyautey; Lucien Lacaze (as interim); Paul Painlevé
- Chief of Staff: Joseph Joffre; Robert Nivelle
- Preceded by: Émile Fayolle
- Succeeded by: François Anthoine

Pierre Auguste Roques (28 December 1856 – 26 February 1920) was a French general and creator of the French air force.

== Biography ==
Born to a modest family in Marseillan, Hérault, his lively intelligence earned him a study grant that allowed him to prepare for the entrance examinations to the École Polytechnique. He entered the École Polytechnique in 1877 and became a friend of Joseph Joffre. Having chosen the military engineering branch of the army he was commissioned as an officer in 1879 (at that time, more engineering than military). During his colonial campaigns, he created a vast number of structures (railways, bridges, roads) in Tonkin, Algeria and, above all, in Madagascar. According to historians, this island owes a large part of its infrastructure to Roques. By 1906, Roques had been promoted to the rank of général de brigade.

As Director of Engineering, Roques was preoccupied from 1906 with the management of the new air service. He was the founder and organiser of French military aviation, and was appointed the Permanent Inspector of Military Aeronautics in 1910. The 1911 aeroplane contest in Reims - the world's first - was intended to allow the French military to evaluate and buy 'scientifically' its first aeroplanes. Roques decided the établissements d'aéronautique (aeronautical establishments) should be called escadrilles (squadrons) and aéroplanes should henceforth be called avions, after the name chosen by Clément Ader for his own aircraft and in homage to this visionary engineer with whom he corresponded regularly. It was also Roques who initiated the carnet de vol (pilot's log book) system, still in use today. The names introduced by Roques quickly came to be generally accepted as part of the French lexicon.

At the outbreak of the First World War, he was the commanding general of the 12th Corps. By January 1915 he had become the commander of the First Army.

Roques was appointed Minister of War in March 1916 after it had been ensured that the Commander-in-Chief Joffre, who had been criticised by the previous incumbent General Gallieni, had no objection to his appointment. Roques was sent on a fact-finding mission to Salonika after Britain, Italy and Russia had pushed for the dismissal of Sarrail, the theatre commander. To the surprise of Prime Minister Briand and Joffre, Roques returned recommending that Sarrail's forces be built up to thirty divisions ready for an attack on Bulgaria. He did not specifically praise Sarrail, but recommended that Sarrail no longer report to Joffre. Coming on the back of the disappointing results of the Somme campaign and the defeat of Romania, Roques’ report further discredited Briand and Joffre and began the political manoeuvres which led to Joffre's removal. On 13 December Briand formed a new government, replacing Roques with Lyautey.

Subsequently, Roques served briefly as the commander of the Fourth Army and then as the Inspector General of Works and Organization for the French Army until February 1919.

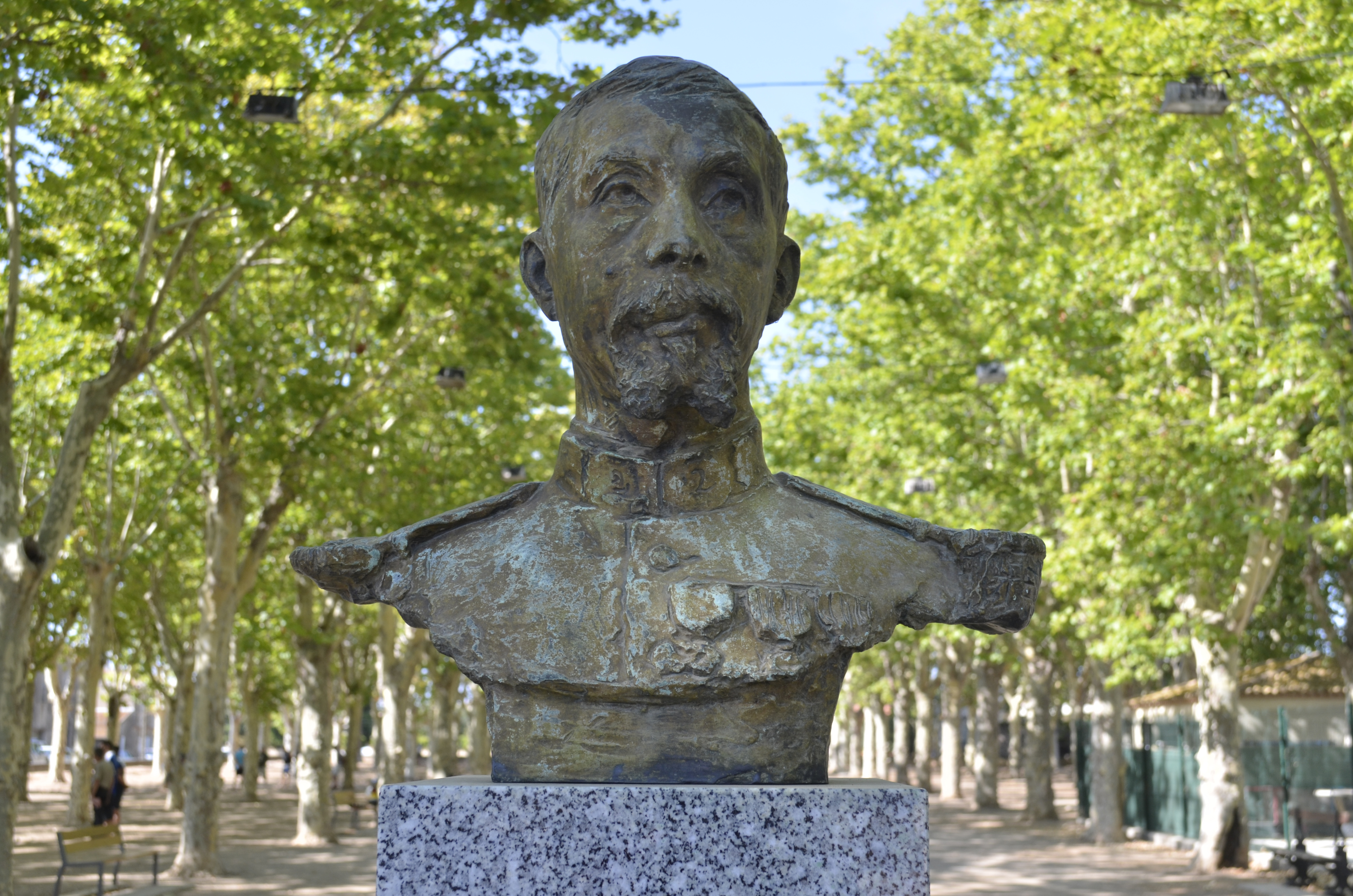
Statue of general Roques in Marseillan.

His war service exhausted him and he died at Saint-Cloud in 1920. Buried initially in his native Marseillan, his remains were transferred to the Hôtel des Invalides in Paris.

== Awards ==
- 1912 - Grand Officier de la Légion d'honneur
- 1916 - le Grand Croix de la Légion d'honneur
- 1920 - Médaille militaire - Épée d'honneur de la ville de Marseillan

== Books ==
- Doughty, Robert A. (2005). Pyrrhic Victory. Harvard University Press. ISBN 978-0-674-02726-8.
- Krause, Jonathan; Philpott, William (2023). French Generals of the Great War: Leading the Way. Pen and Sword Books. ISBN 978-1781592526.

Military offices
New title Post created	Permanent Inspector of Military Aeronautics; 8 November 1910 – 9 April 1912	Succeeded by Auguste Edouard Hirschauer
Preceded by Tell Aristide Frédéric Antoine Chapel	Commander of the Seventh Infantry Division; 9 April 1912 – 18 August 1913	Succeeded by Edgard de Trentinian
Preceded by Auguste Charles Lucien Pélecier	Commander of the Twelfth Army Corps; 18 August 1913 – 5 January 1915	Succeeded by Henri Jean Descoings
Preceded by Auguste Dubail	Commander of the First Army; 5 January 1915 – 16 March 1916	Succeeded by Olivier Mazel
Preceded by Émile Fayolle	Commander of the Fourth Army; 31 December 1916 – 23 March 1917	Succeeded by François Anthoine
Political offices
Preceded by Joseph Gallieni	Minister of War; 16 March 1916 – 12 December 1916	Succeeded by Hubert Lyautey
