= Flaminius Raiberti =

French politician

Baron Flaminius Raiberti
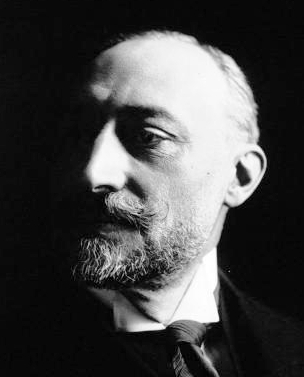
- Flaminius Raiberti in 1913

Minister of War of France
- In office 16 December 1920 – 16 January 1921
- President: Alexandre Millerand
- Prime Minister: Georges Leygues
- Preceded by: André Joseph Lefèvre
- Succeeded by: Louis Barthou

Minister of the Navy of France
- In office 15 January 1922 – 29 March 1924
- President: Alexandre Millerand
- Prime Minister: Raymond Poincaré
- Preceded by: Gabriel Guist'hau
- Succeeded by: Maurice Bokanowski

Personal details
- Born: 13 April 1862 Nice, Alpes-Maritimes, France
- Died: 16 December 1929 (aged 67) Nice, Alpes-Maritimes, France

Flaminius Raiberti (13 April 1862 – 16 December 1929) was a French politician who was a Radical Republican deputy for Nice for 32 years, and then a member of the Senate for seven years. He was Minister for War and then Minister of the Navy after World War I (1914–18).

== Life ==
=== Early years ===
Baron Flaminius Raiberti was born in Nice, Alpes-Maritimes on 13 April 1862 into an aristocratic family. He was descended from Louis Raiberti, a "notaire ducal" of Saint-Martin-Lantosque (today Saint-Martin-Vésubie) who died in 1639. Some of his ancestors served in the army of the Kingdom of Sardinia. He enrolled in the Faculty of Law and then joined the Bar of Nice. In 1888 Raiberti founded a journal, La Révision, which reflected Boulangist views. However, he abandoned Boulangism before becoming a deputy. He became a General Councilor, then on 30 March 1890 was elected to the Chamber of Deputies for the 1st district of Nice.

=== Deputy ===
Raiberti was aged 27 when he was elected, and would hold office for 32 years until entering the Senate in 1922. He was reelected for the same seat on 20 August 1893 as a Radical candidate, and was again reelected on 8 May 1898, on 27 April 1902, on 6 May 1906, on 26 April 1914 and on 16 November 1919 on the Republican and Democratic Union platform. Raiberti was vice-president of the Budget Committee in 1917, and was later Chairman of the Finance Committee. He showed his liberal views in discussions on employment contracts, social assistance, workers' pensions, working hours and subsidized housing. Raiberti became a member of the Association internationale pour la protection légale des travailleurs, which aimed for the unification of international labor unification. In 1908 he joined the Musée social, primarily to participate in its new section on urban and rural hygiene.

=== Local politics ===
Raiberti rejected the dual mandate, refusing to become a candidate for Mayor of Nice, which he felt would give him undue advantage in national elections. However he was General Councilor for Contes from 1901 and was elected to represent Menton in 1919. He was president of the Alpes-Maritimes Departmental Assembly from 1911 to 1927. During his long term of office Raiberti converted the Alpes-Maritimes to a more democratic Republicanism in place of rule by opportunistic notables. The old guard of politicians, whose power he gradually attacked, had close ties to banking, insurance, railway and real estate interests and used vote-buying and intimidation to stay in power. As a deputy he intervened in budget discussion in favor of development of his region, and played an important role in development of railways, including the Puget-Théniers – Saint-André line and the Nice – Cuneo line that connects Nice to the Italian border. He also ensured fast trains from Nice to Paris.

=== Minister and Senator ===
Raiberti was briefly Minister of War in the cabinet of Georges Leygues from 16 December 1920 to 16 January 1921. After leaving this post during a cabinet reshuffle he was elected vice president of the Chamber of Deputies in 1921, and re-elected to this position in 1922. Raiberti was Minister of Marine in the cabinet of Raymond Poincaré from 15 January 1922 to 29 March 1924. He was elected Senator for Alpes-Maritimes on 26 March 1922, retaining his post as minister. Under his leadership legislation was introduced to renovate the navy, He left the government in 1924, and returned to parliamentary work in the Senate's Finance, Army and Air committees. In failing health, he lost the election of 20 October 1929. Flaminius Raiberti died in Nice on 16 December 1929 aged 67.

== Legacy ==
The D15 in Contes, Alpes-Maritimes to the north of Nice is named the Avenue Flaminius Raiberti. The Musée ferroviaire Flaminius Raiberti (Flaminius Raiberti Railway Museum) is a fully renovated station concourse in the hamlet of Sainte Thècle in the Vallée du Peillon. It describes the Chemins de fer de Paris à Lyon et à la Méditerranée (PLM) network, and focuses on construction of the single-track railway line from Nice to Cuneo, Italy.

== Publications ==
- Raiberti, Flaminius (1893). Proposition de loi relative à la constitution des cadres et des effectifs de l'armée active et de l'armée territoriale... présentée par M. Raiberti,... (29 février 1893.). Motteroz. p. 177.
- Raiberti, Flaminius (1896). Rapport fait au nom de la Commission chargée d'examiner le projet de loi portant approbation des Conventions de délimitation et de commerce signées à Pékin, le 20 juin 1895, entre la France et la Chine, Par M. Raiberti,... (30 janvier 1896). Motteroz. p. 12.
- Raiberti, Flaminius (1897). Rapport fait au nom de la Commission de l'armée chargée d'examiner : 1 ° La proposition de loi de M. M. le Comte de Tréveneuc, de Malvy et plusieurs de leurs collègues, portant organisation du haut commandement dans l'armée française; 2 ° La proposition de loi de M. Raiberti, sur le service d'état major, Par M. Raiberti,... (9 décembre 1897). Motteroz. p. 39.
- Raiberti, Flaminius (1900). Rapport... (budget général de 1901 : ministère de la guerre) par M. Raiberti,... (10 juillet 1900.). Motteroz. p. 364.

== Sources ==
- Bellon, Christophe (2011). "Au fondement d'une génération politique : le baron Flaminius Raiberti et le modèle républicain en terres maralpines (1890-1929)". Parlement[s], Revue d'histoire politique. 3.
- Bianchini, Roger-Louis (2001-11-01). "Les Fatou-Raiberti". L'Express.
- Horne, Janet Regina (2002-01-11). A Social Laboratory for Modern France: The Musée Social and the Rise of the Welfare State. Duke University Press. p. 124. ISBN 0-8223-2792-9.
- Jolly, Jean (1977). "RAIBERTI (Baron FLAMINIUS)". Dictionnaire des parlementaires français de 1889 à 1940 (in French).
- "Musée ferroviaire Flaminius Raiberti - Peillon". CRT Côte d'Azur.
- "Plan Avenue FLAMINIUS RAIBERTI (Contes)". Gralon.
