= Marie-Jean-Lucien Lacaze =

French admiral, minister of Marine, préfet maritime and académicien

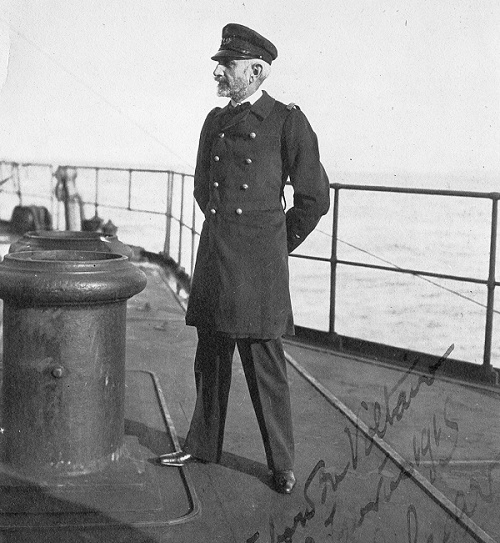
Lucien Lacaze (1915)

Marie-Jean-Lucien Lacaze (22 June 1860, Pierrefonds, Oise – 23 March 1955, Paris) was a French admiral, minister of Marine, préfet maritime and académicien.

== Biography ==
Lacaze was born in Pierrefonds, Oise to a physician of Réunion, where he spent his youth. He studied in France with the Jesuits, and joined the École Navale in 1879.

Lacaze served as capitaine de vaisseau in Senegal, India and Viet-Nam. He was naval attaché in Rome and chief of staff to Admiral Germinet. He then took command of the Masséna, before serving as chief of cabinet to minister of the Navy Théophile Delcassé.

During the First World War, Lacaze led a division of the Mediterranean fleet, and organised part of the Dardanelles Campaign. Lacaze was made Minister of the Navy in October 1915.

He was briefly acting War Minister in December 1916, between the resignation of Pierre Roques and the arrival of Hubert Lyautey from Morocco to take up the post. Whilst in post he oversaw the removal of Ferdinand Foch from command of Army Group North and the replacement of Joseph Joffre by Robert Nivelle as Commander-in-Chief of the French Army on the Western Front.

He remained Minister of the Navy until 1917. He then went on to serve as préfet maritime of Toulon.

After retiring in 1922, Lacaze was elected to the Académie française on 12 November 1936, obtaining Jules Cambon's seat (seat n°40).

== Books ==
- Greenhalgh, Elizabeth (2014). The French Army and the First World War. Cambridge University Press. ISBN 978-1-107-60568-8.
