= List of French generals who died during the First World War =

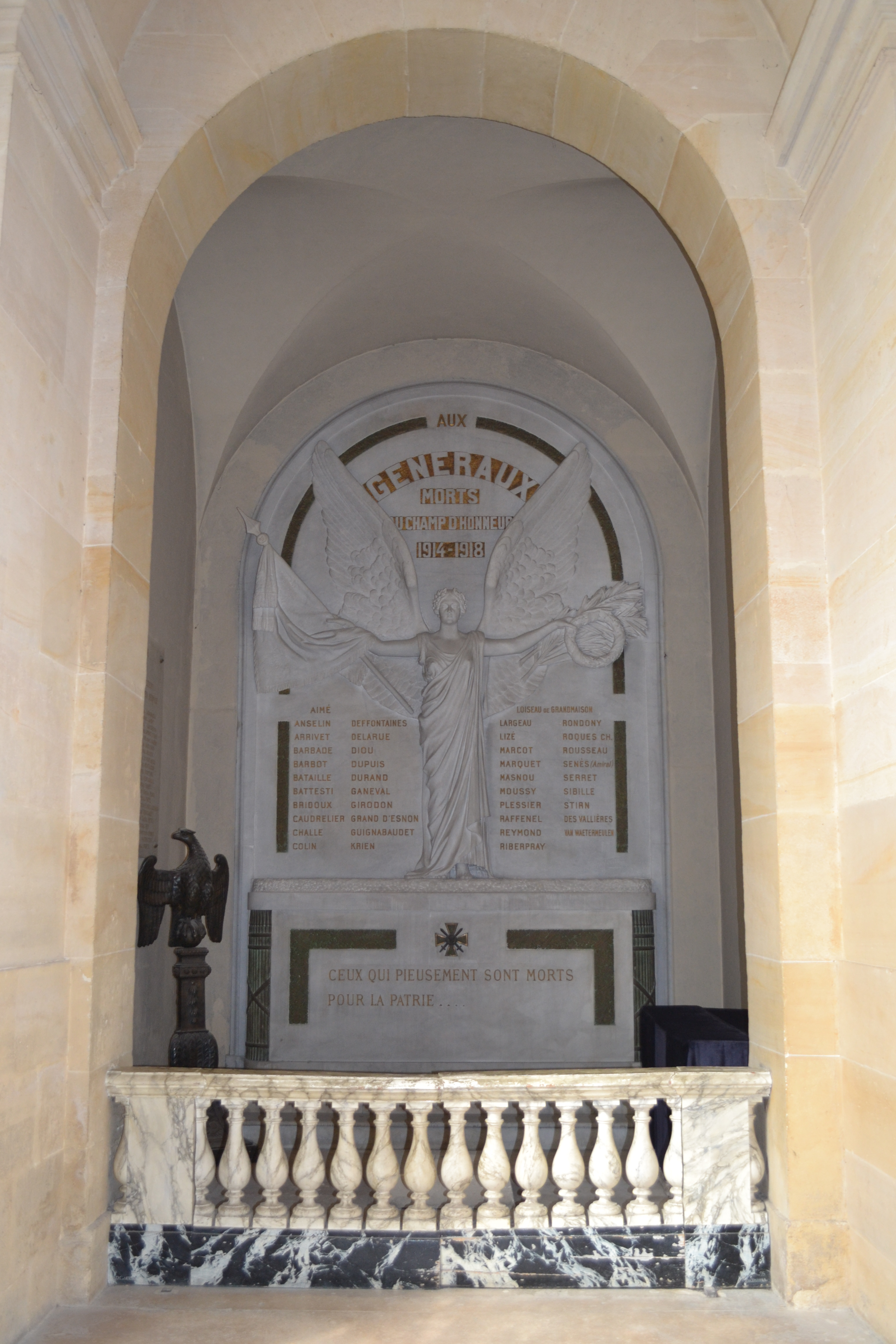
The Mémorial des Généraux 1914–1918 at the Cathedral of Saint-Louis des Invalides lists 40 of the generals killed during the war as well as Admiral Victor-Baptistin Senès.

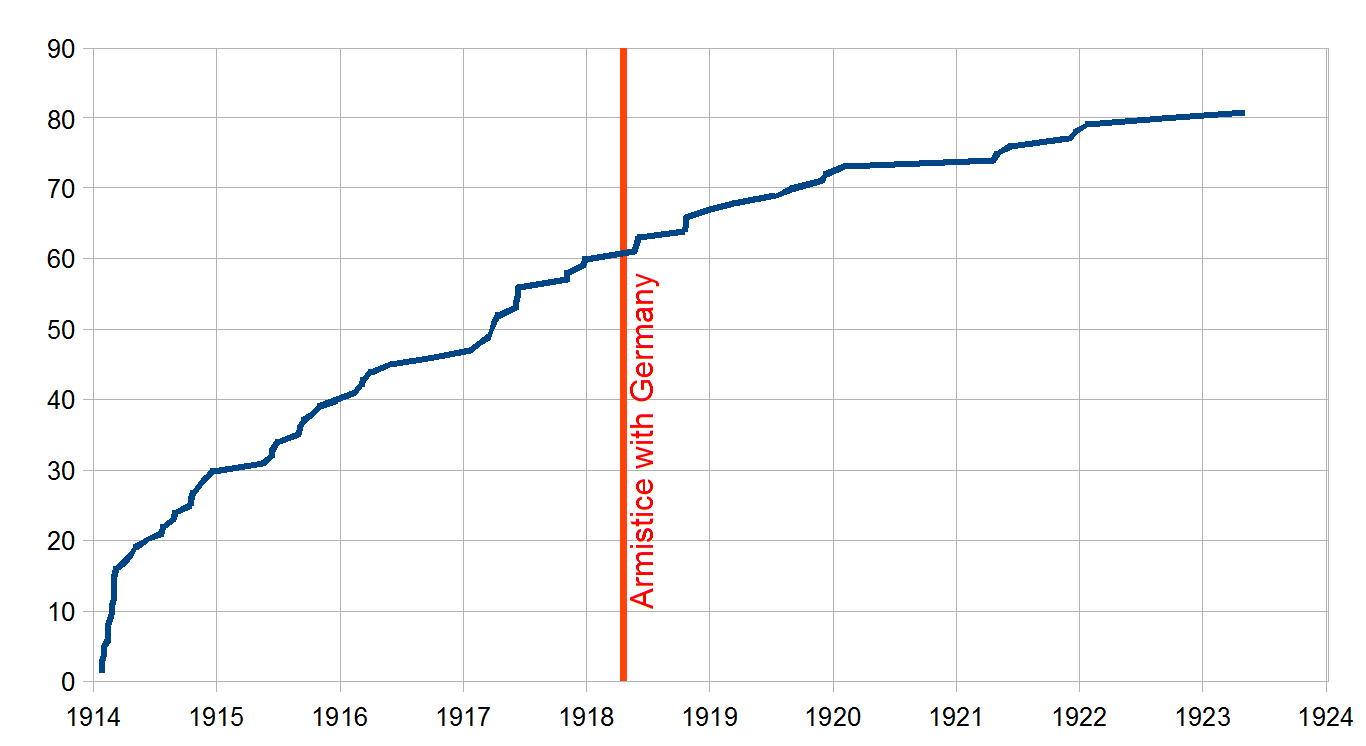
Cumulative total of French generals who died because of the war by date. The signing of the armistice on 11 November 1918 is denoted by the red line.

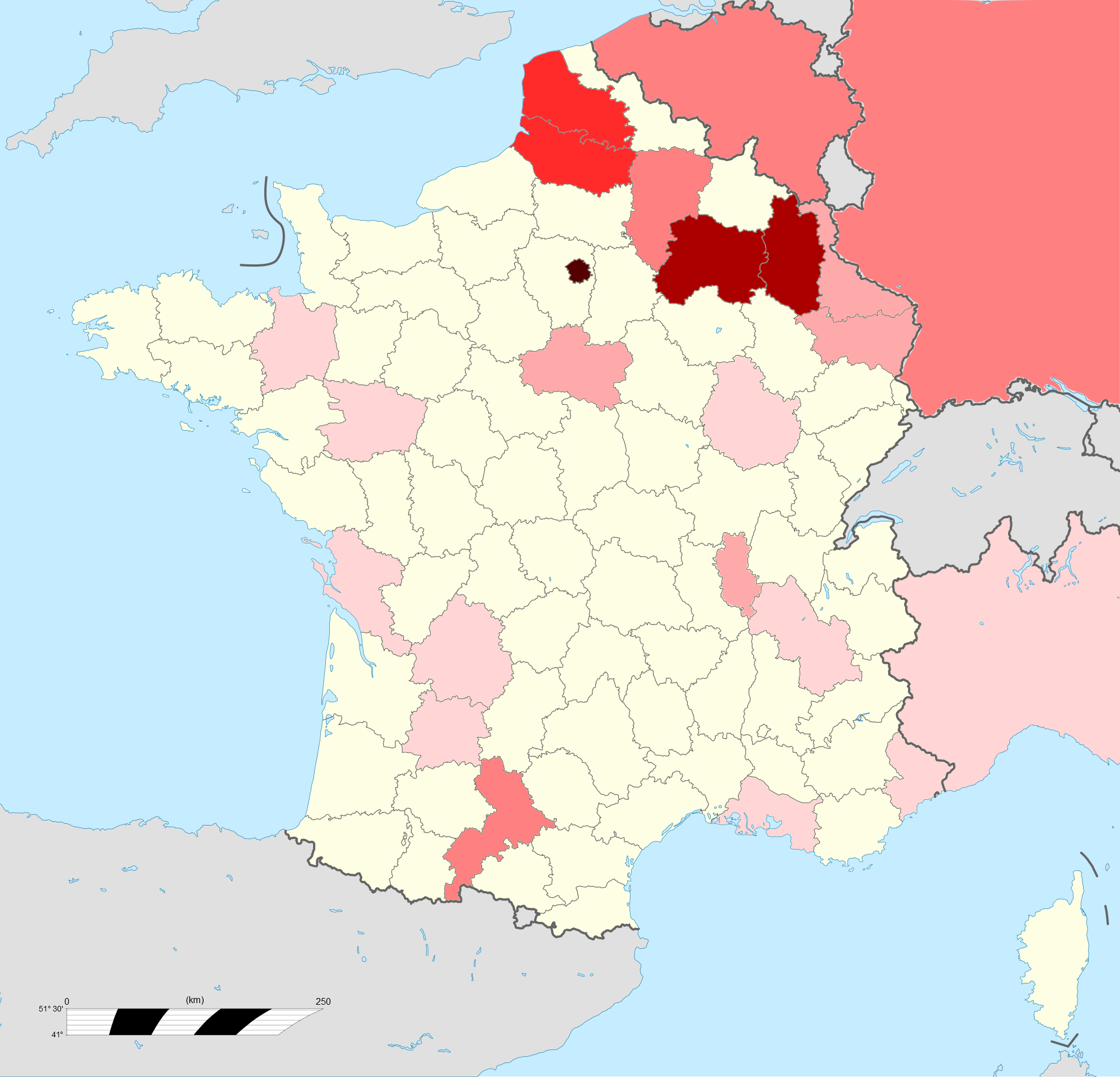
Map showing the departments or countries of death (red shading shows location of death, darker shades indicating more deaths)

This is a list of French generals who died during the First World War (1914–1918). The list is published by the French war graves authority Le Souvenir français and includes all generals they have determined to have mort pour la France (lit. 'died for France'). It includes those killed in action or died of wounds but also those who died from illness contracted on active duty. The list includes generals who died as late as 1923.

== Background ==
In 1914 the French Army of around 770,000 men maintained 21 army corps of around two divisions each. There were a total of 47 infantry and 10 cavalry divisions which included 92 infantry brigades, 38 cavalry brigades, and 21 field artillery brigades; these formations would typically have been commanded by a general officer. By the war's end in 1918 the army had expanded to 3,000,000 men in 113 divisions. During that time it had suffered 1,327,000 men killed, died of wounds, or missing and presumed dead.

There were only two general officer ranks in the French Army, that of général de brigade (equivalent to brigadier-general) and of général de division (equivalent to major-general). Généraux de brigade (and sometimes colonels) commanded brigades and sub-divisions of larger units, while armies, corps and divisions were led by généraux de division; additional generals were required to serve in staff positions. The military distinction (not rank) of Marshal of France, held for life, was sometimes granted to senior generals. At the start of the war in 1914 there had been no living marshals since the death of François Certain de Canrobert in 1895. During the course of the war it would be awarded to two generals, Joseph Joffre and Ferdinand Foch, with Philippe Pétain receiving the honour shortly after the 11 November 1918 armistice. Five other generals were granted the honour in the early 1920s, in two cases (Michel-Joseph Maunoury and Joseph Gallieni) the men had died as generals during the war.

Age limits for active service were 62 years for généraux de brigade and 65 for généraux de division. Generals tended to be towards the upper limit of these ages, with all army commanders in August 1914 aged between 61 and 64. Low pay and slow career progression led to a shortage of officers and non-commissioned officers in the pre-war French Army. At the outbreak of the war the army was short 400 officers of all ranks. It could put into the field only 120 généraux de division out of a requirement of 160 and just 220 généraux de brigade, out of a requirement of 260. Additional generals were recalled from retirement, though many of these were elderly and ill suited for campaigning.

== List ==
The Le Souvenir français is responsible for maintaining French war memorials and cemeteries and providing information about war dead. It maintains a list of military personnel determined to have mort pour la France ("died for France"), a designation granted under the French Code des pensions militaires d'invalidité et des victimes de guerre ("code for military disability pensions and victims of war"). The designation is granted for those killed in action, died of wounds, died from illness contracted on active duty or executed by an occupying power among other categories.

Le Souvenir français publishes selections of those who died in the First World War as Livre d'or des morts pour la France de la guerre de 1914-1918 ("Golden book of those who died for France in the 1914-1918 war"). This list is extracted from Le Souvenir français member Gérard Gehin's Livre d'or des officiers superieurs morts pour la France guerre 14-18 ("Golden book of superior officers who died for France in the 1914-1918 war"). Gehin's work lists all officers of lieutenant-colonel rank or above, but only the 81 officers who held general rank at the time of their death are listed here. It includes some officers who died as late as 1923 where Le Souvenir français has determined they qualify as mort pour la France. Where details are missing from Gehin's list additional information has been taken from the sources cited.

French historian Laurent Guillemot published a book, La Liste de Foch (French: Foch's list), in 2017 that discussed the French generals who died during the war. He notes that Foch prepared a list of 40 he deemed to have been killed in action (plus Admiral Victor-Baptistin Senès), whose names were inscribed on the memorial at Les Invalides. To this list Guillemot adds Général de Brigade Corneille Trumelet-Faber who died of wounds following a German shell explosion. Guillemot noted that the average age of the men he listed was 56.5 years and that two-thirds were killed by shell fire and the remainder shot. He notes that around 76 British generals were killed in the war, 2 Belgian, 2 Italian, and 2 Romanians. On the opposing side he notes around 70 German generals, 40 Austro-Hungarian, and one Ottoman killed.

In the list below generals listed by Foch are denoted in red.

Image	Name	Rank	Unit commanded	Date of death	Department or country of death	Cause of death
	Ernest Jean Aime	Général de brigade	67th Infantry Division	6 September 1916	Meuse, France	Enemy action
	Ernest Anselin	Général de brigade	214th Infantry Brigade	24 October 1916	Meuse, France	Enemy action
	Emile Olivier Paul Arlabosse	Général de brigade	45th Infantry Brigade	5 February 1920	Lot-et-Garonne, France	Sickness contracted on service
	Paul Arrivet	Général de brigade	109th Reserve Infantry Brigade	29 October 1914	Somme, France	Enemy action
	Albert Baratier	Général de division	134th Infantry Division	17 October 1917	Marne, France	Died suddenly
	Ernest Auguste Barbade	Général de brigade	25th Infantry Brigade	10 September 1914	Marne, France	Enemy action
	Ernest Jacques Barbot	Général de brigade	77th Infantry Division	10 May 1915	Pas-de-Calais, France	Enemy action
	Joseph Louis Alphonse Baret	Général de division	6th Military Region	28 August 1920	Isère, France	Sickness
	Marie Désiré Pierre Bataille	Général de brigade	41st Infantry Division	8 September 1914	Vosges, France	Enemy action
	Jules Augustin Williams Léon Battesti	Général de brigade	52nd Reserve Infantry Division	25 September 1914	Marne, France	Enemy action
	Victor Paul Bouttieaux	Général de brigade	Engineers, 4th Army Corps	22 July 1918	Seine-et-Oise, France	Accident on service
	Marie Joseph Eugène Bridoux	Général de division	Bridoux Cavalry Corps	25 September 1914	Somme, France	Enemy action
	Paul Constant Caudrelier	Général de brigade	6th Colonial Infantry Brigade	30 November 1914	Marne, France	Enemy action
	Georges Challe	Général de brigade	148th Infantry Brigade	11 October 1917	Meuse, France	Enemy action
	Aimé Charles Henri de Clermont-Tonnerre	Général de brigade	113th Infantry Brigade	22 December 1916	Côte-d'Or, France	Sickness
	Jean Lambert Alphonse Colin	Général de brigade	Infantry, 30th Infantry Division	30 December 1917	Serbia	Enemy action
	Camille Cousin	Général de brigade	165th Territorial Infantry Brigade	16 April 1917	Seine, France	Enemy action
	Etienne Albert Crepey	Général de division	14th Infantry Division	24 October 1917	Haute-Garonne, France	Sickness
	Achille Pierre Deffontaines	Général de brigade	24th Infantry Division	26 August 1914	Marne, France	Died of wounds
	Gilbert Etienne Defforges	Général de division	5th Military Region	28 March 1915	Loiret, France	Sickness
	Louis Gabriel Alexandre Delarue	Général de brigade	121st Reserve Infantry Brigade	20 March 1915	Marne, France	Enemy action
	Nicolas Victor Delmotte	Général de brigade	33rd Infantry Division	22 January 1916	Somme, France	Sickness
	Pierre des Vallières	Général de brigade	151st Infantry Division	28 May 1918	Aisne, France	Enemy action
	Paul Emile Diou	Général de brigade	63rd Infantry Brigade	23 August 1914	Aisne, France	Died of wounds
	Léon Adrien Duflos	Général de brigade	Inspector-General of the National Gendarmerie	15 May 1919	Bouches-du-Rhône, France	Sickness
	Gaston Dupuis	Général de brigade	67th Infantry Brigade	9 September 1914	Marne, France	Enemy action
	Georges Jacques Durand	Général de brigade	69th Infantry Brigade	18 November 1914	Charente-Maritime, France	Died of wounds
	François Eugène Durupt	Général de brigade	147th Infantry Brigade	15 August 1922	Seine, France	Died of wounds
	Joseph Gallieni	Général de division (also a Marshal of France)	Military Governor of Paris	27 May 1916	Seine-et-Oise, France	Sickness
	Marie François Adolphe Ganeval	Général de brigade	3rd Infantry Brigade of the Oriental Expeditionary Corps	7 June 1915	Ottoman Empire	Enemy action
	Auguste Gérôme	Général de division	1st Group of the Eastern Division	10 May 1919	Bouches-du-Rhône, France	Sickness
	Pierre Girodon	Général de brigade	12th Infantry Division	25 September 1916	Somme, France	Enemy action
	Charles Antoine Grand D'Esnon	Général de brigade	149th Reserve Infantry Brigade	21 September 1914	Meuse, France	Enemy action
	Paul François Grossetti	Général de division	Army of the Orient	7 January 1918	Somme, France	Sickness
	Pierre Amable Guignabaudet	Général de division	41st Infantry Division	30 May 1918	Belgium	Died of wounds
	Alfred Emile Hollender	Général de brigade	Assistant commander of the 3rd Military Region	1 October 1919	Moselle, France	Sickness
	Charles Jacquot	Général de division	35th Army Corps	22 June 1922	Vosges, France	Died of wounds
	Henri Pierre Jullien	Général de brigade	Military Governor of Langres	27 December 1918	Seine, France	Sickness
	Athanase Marie Krien	Général de brigade	35th Infantry Brigade	9 May 1916	Meuse, France	Died of wounds
	Emile Eugène Ladoux	Général de brigade	Depot of the 12th Artillery Brigade	12 November 1921	Seine, France	Sickness
	Pierre Henri Lafont	Général de brigade	French Military Mission to Romania	12 December 1918	Romania	Sickness
	Paul Lancrenon	Général de division	Assistant to the General Commander of the Staff	10 July 1922	Seine, France	Sickness
	Henri Armand de Laporte d'Hust	Général de brigade	55th Infantry Division	3 October 1916	Meuse, France	Sickness
	Victor Emmanuel Largeau	Général de brigade	37th Infantry Brigade	27 March 1916	Meuse, France	Sickness
	Jean Pierre Larroque	Général de brigade	10th Colonial Infantry Division	31 December 1921	Tarn-et-Garonne, France	Sickness
	Emile Charles Lavisse	Général de brigade	Assistant Commander of the 15th Military Region	28 June 1915	Seine, France	Died of wounds
	Pierre Auguste Georges Léré	Général de brigade	92nd Territorial Infantry Division	15 February 1915	Pas-de-Calais, France	Sickness
	Lucien Lizé	Général de brigade	Artillery of the French Army in Italy	5 January 1918	Italy	Enemy action
	Louis Loyzeau de Grandmaison	Général de division	5th Group of Reserve Divisions	19 February 1915	Aisne, France	Died of wounds
	Gabriel Malleterre	Général de brigade	Director, Army Museum	26 November 1923	Seine, France	Died of wounds
	Louis François Marcot	Général de division	81st Territorial Infantry Division	4 October 1914	Pas-de-Calais, France	Enemy action
	Louis Joseph Margueron	Général de brigade	120th Infantry Brigade	30 December 1917	Seine, France	Sickness
	Georges Marquet	Général de brigade	17th Infantry Brigade	16 September 1914	Meuse, France	Enemy action
	Joseph Georges Antoine Masnou	Général de division	1st Division of the Oriental Expeditionary Corps	17 July 1915	Mediterranean	Died of wounds
	Michel Joseph Maunoury	Général de division (also a Marshal of France)	On reserve list	28 March 1923	Loiret, France	Sickness
	Victor Joseph Antoine Meunier	Général de division	Military Governor of Lyon	13 July 1916	Seine, France	Sickness
	Frédéric Henry Micheler	Général de division	5th Army Corps	15 August 1917	Rhône, France	Died of wounds
	Marie Henry Louis de Montangon	Général de brigade	105th Reserve Infantry Brigade	29 July 1919	Seine, France	Sickness
	Louis Fernand Montaudon	Général de brigade	Cavalry depots, 9th Military Region	29 March 1916	Maine-et-Loire, France	Sickness
	Alphonse Jean André Monterou	Général de brigade	30th Infantry Division	19 May 1919	Haute-Garonne, France	Sickness
	Charles Montignault	Général de brigade	1st Colonial Infantry Brigade	24 November 1921	Ille-et-Vilaine, France	Sickness
	Jean Baptiste Albert Moussy	Général de brigade	33rd Infantry Division	21 May 1915	Pas-de-Calais, France	Enemy action
	Joseph Maurice Pambet	Général de division	Assistant to the commander of the 12th Military Region	6 January 1916	Dordogne, France	Accident on service
	Louis Victor Plessier	Général de brigade	88th Infantry Brigade	27 August 1914	Rhône, France	Died of wounds
	Jean Baptiste Joseph Proye	Général de brigade	45th Infantry Brigade	10 December 1915	Seine, France	Died of wounds
	Léon Amédée François Raffenel	Général de brigade	3rd Colonial Infantry Division	22 August 1914	Belgium	Enemy action
	Camille Marie Emile Ravenez	Général de brigade	315th Infantry Brigade	7 November 1917	Alpes-Maritimes, France	Sickness
	Marius Abel Rey	Général de brigade	Military Government of Paris	17 December 1918	Seine, France	Sickness
	Edouard Auguste Reymond	Général de brigade	4th Colonial Infantry Brigade	27 December 1914	Marne, France	Enemy action
	Georges Emile Riberpray	Général de brigade	128th Infantry Division	11 September 1917	Meuse, France	Enemy action
	Charles Rondony	Général de brigade	3rd Colonial Brigade	22 August 1914	Belgium	Enemy action
	Charles Auguste Henri Roques	Général de brigade	10th Infantry Division	26 September 1914	Meuse, France	Died of wounds
	Jean Louis Théodore Rousseau	Général de brigade	137th Reserve Infantry Brigade	20 September 1914	Marne, France	Enemy action
	Christian Léon Sauret	Général de brigade	2nd Section of General Officers	30 June 1920		Sickness
	Marcel Serret	Général de brigade	66th Infantry Division	6 January 1916	Haut-Rhin, Germany	Died of wounds
	Charles Antoine Sibille	Général de brigade	64th Infantry Brigade	27 September 1914	Meurthe-et-Moselle, France	Enemy action
	Jean Paul Ernest Stirn	Général de brigade	77th Infantry Division	12 May 1915	Pas-de-Calais, France	Enemy action
	Corneille Gustave Ernest Trumelet-Faber	Général de brigade	81st Territorial Infantry Division	11 April 1916	Seine, France	Died of wounds
	Henri Alexis Joseph Vanwaetermeulen	Général de brigade	Infantry, 165th Division	16 July 1918	Marne, France	Died of wounds
	Paul Venel	Général de brigade	With the Army of the Orient	25 March 1920	Meurthe-et-Moselle, France	Sickness
	Walter Waddington	Général de brigade	12th Dragoon Brigade	23 June 1920	Germany	Sickness

== See also ==
- List of generals of the British Empire who died during the First World War
- List of German generals who died during the First World War
- List of Italian generals who died during the First World War
