= Battle of Fontenoy order of battle =

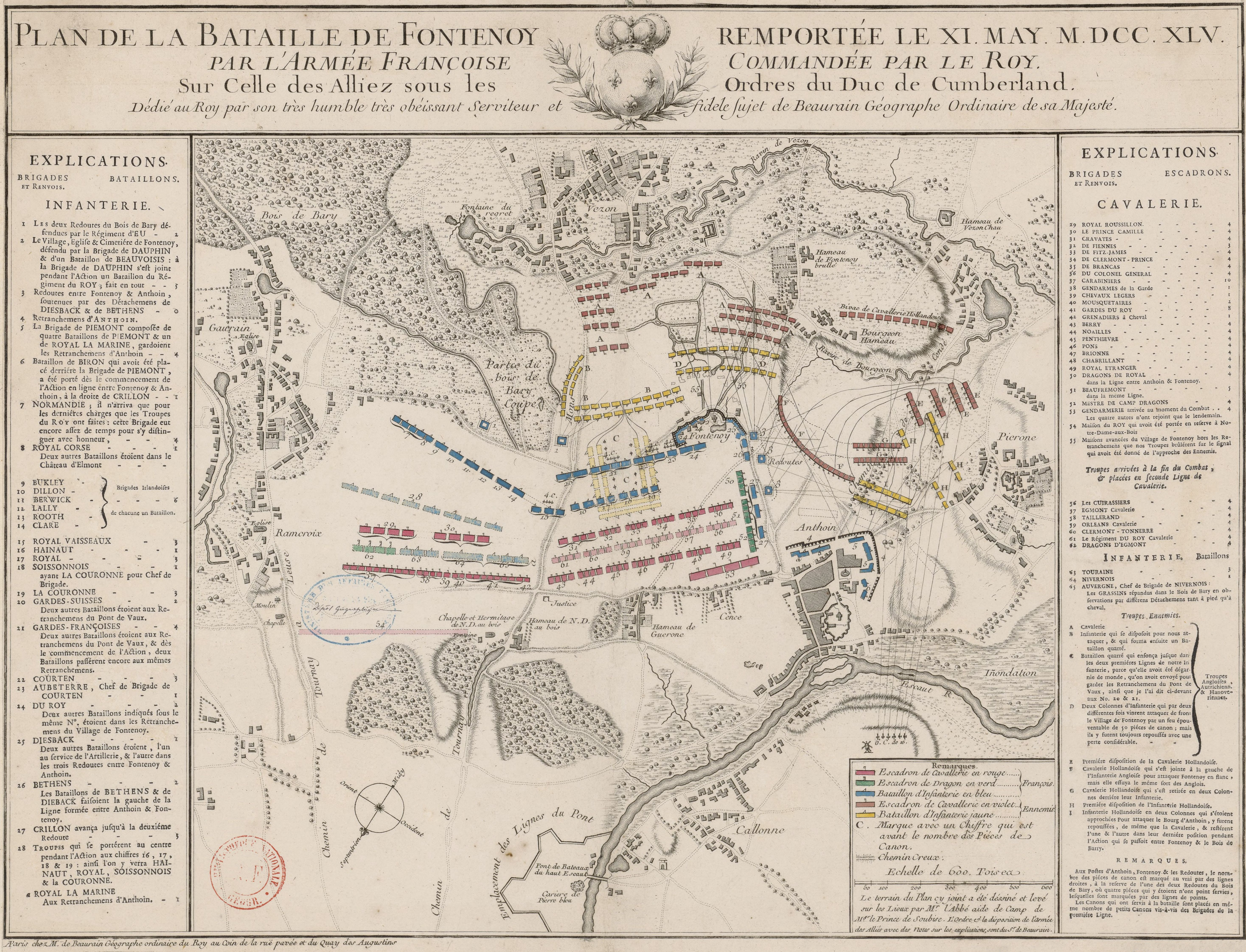
Battle of Fontenoy with key to French and Allied deployments.

The Battle of Fontenoy, 11 May 1745, was a major engagement of the War of the Austrian Succession, fought between the forces of the Pragmatic Army – comprising mainly Dutch, British, and Hanoverian troops, as well a relatively small contingent of Austrians under the command of the Duke of Cumberland – and a French army under the titular command of King Louis XV of France, with actual field command held by Maurice de Saxe, commander of Louis XV's forces in the Low Countries.

When the two armies met on the field they were approximately equal in numbers. Although there is not complete agreement among historians on the exact numbers, there is general agreement that there were about 50,000 men on each side with the French having more cavalry and the allies having more infantry. Some historians put the French as more numerous while others make the allies more numerous.

Complete agreement on the order of battle, sizes of the armies, precise returns on casualties is not possible as official returns are few and made by different countries with differing criteria and not all are made at the same time so that variations and disagreements will occur even in those returns of the same army. For example, Skrine points out his book in Fontenoy and Great Britain's share in the war of the Austrian Succession that most of the British troops that were listed as missing, in initial returns, turned out to have been killed or wounded. There are detailed, contemporary, official returns in various forms available for most troops in both armies except for the French cavalry for which there are some lists of officer casualties but the returns for the rank and file were apparently not made and the estimate generally accepted for their losses is the one made by Voltaire shortly after the battle. Wherever possible, names of units and numbers of casualties are given without any attempt to reconcile or synthesize the various sources.

== Order of Battle for the Army of Louis XV of France at Fontenoy 1745 ==
Historians give various estimates for the French army. With a general lack of primary source information just before the battle on the exact number of soldiers involved, the estimates rely on a better understanding of the numbers of battalions and squadrons present at the battle and multiply the total of battalions and squadrons by an average for each. Skrine arrives at his estimate by multiplying the number of battalions by 690 soldiers and the number of squadrons by 160 troopers. This approach can be flawed. Lucien Moulliard in The French Army of Louis XV states that the regulation strength, or paper strength, of a battalion is 685 men and that of a squadron is 150 to 160. Actual field strength is lower than regulation strength due to various forms of attrition such as illness, straggling, desertion death, wounds or capture in battle prior to the battle in question.

=== French Army ===
Unit	Commander	Complement	Killed	Wounded	Missing	Total losses
Army of France	Marshal Maurice de Saxe	52,000 ~ 47,000 engaged 32,000 Infantry in 55 battalions 14,000 Cavalry in 101 squadrons				7,000-7,500; 5,161 Infantry; 2,300 Cavalry
Left of first French Infantry Line	General Lutteaux					
Rgt. Royal Corse		1 battalion				
Rgt. Angoumois	Colonel Noël Jourda de Vaux	1 battalion		1 off.		
Brigade Normandie	Comte de Berenger					
Rgt. Normandie		4 battalions	4 off. 57 men	19 off. 152 men		
Grassins in Bari Wood		2 battalions	98 men	11 off. 132 men		
Brigade d'Eu	Marquis de Chambonas	4 battalions				
Rgt. d'Eu in 2 redoubts		1 battalion 4 guns each redoubt	1 man	29 men		
Irish Brigade	Milord Thomond & Comte de Rooth	6 battalions	13 off. 261 men	58 off. 324 men		
Rgt. Dillon	Colonel James Dillon †	1 battalion	3 off. 51 men	11 off. 70 men		
Rgt. Bulkeley		1 battalion	20 men	4 off. 34 men		
Rgt. Clare		1 battalion	4 off. 56 men	14 off. 72 men		
Rgt. Rooth		1 battalion	2 off. 47 men	8 off. 46 men		
Rgt. Berwick		1 battalion	1 off. 52 men	11 off.60 men		
Rgt. Lally	Colonel Thomas Arthur, comte de Lally	1 battalion	3 off. 35 men	11 off. 42 men		
Center of first French Infantry Line	General Chabannes					
Les Gardes Brigade	Duc de Grammont †	6 battalions				
Gardes Françaises		4 battalions	2 off. 96 men	17 off. 296 men		
Gardes Suisses		2 battalions	1 off. 66 men	10 off. 149 men		
Brigade Aubeterre						
Rgt. Aubeterre		1 battalion	129 men	22 off. 177 men		
Rgt. Courten		3 battalions	6 off. 75 men	14 off. 206 men		
Center of first French Line in Fontenoy						
Brigade Dauphin	General Vauguyon					
Rgt. Dauphin		3 battalions	4 off. 45 men	3 off. 60 men		
Rgt. Beauvoisis		1 battalion	15 men	5 off. 30 men		
Right of first French Infantry Line	General Montagne					
Brigade Royal Vaisseaux	Comte de Guerchy	4 battalions				
Rgt, Royal Vaisseaux		3 battalions	3 off. 146 men	29 off. 291 men		
Rgt. Languedoc		1 battalion	off. men	off. men		
Brigade du Roi	Duc de Biron					
Rgt. du Roi		4 battalions	4 off. 79 men	33 off. 299 men		
Brigade Royal						
Rgt. Royal		4 battalions	6 off. 136 men	32 off. 509 men		
Brigade La Couronne	Marquis de Croissy	4 battalions				
Rgt. La Couronne	Duc d'Havre	3 battalions	2 off.41 men	35 off. 218 men		
Rgt. Soissonais		1 battalion	2 off. 30 men	16 off. 101 men		
Brigade Bettens		4 battalions				
Rgt. Bettens		3 battalions	1 off. 50 men	5 off. 50 men		
Rgt. Hainault		1 battalion	1 off. 120 men	18 off. 135 men		
Rgt. Diesbach		1 battalion	2 off. 48 men	2 off. 28 men		
Rgt. Royal Artillerie		1 battalion	2 off. 18 men	5 off. 36 men		
Rgt. Auvergne		1 battalion	off. men	off. men		
Rgt.Tresnel			off. men	off. men		
			off. men	off. men		
			off. men	off. men		
			off. men	off. men		
			off. men	off. men		
Rgt.Touraine		3 battalions	off. men	off. men		
Rgt. Nivernois		1 battalion	off. men	off. men		
Brigade Crillon	Colonel Louis des Balbes de Berton de Crillon, 1st Duke of Mahón	4 battalions				
Rgt. Crillon		3 battalions	20 men	1 off. 101 men		
Rgt. Laval						
Right of first French Line in Antoing						
Brigade Piedmont		5 battalions				
Rgt. Piedmont		4 battalions				
Rgt.Royal la Marine		1 battalion	off. men	off. men		
Rgt.Biron		1 battalion	off. men	off. men		
French Horse			31 off.	142 off. 330 men		1,800 - 2,300
Left of first French Cavalry Line						
Carabiniers		10 squadrons	60 off. 130 men	22 off. men ?		
Maison du Roi		9 squadrons	4 off. men	24 off. men		
Gendarmerie		4 squadrons	1 off. men	2 off. men		
Royal Rousillon		4 squadrons	1 off. men	7 off. men		
Royal Cravattes		4 squadrons	1 off. men	6 off. men		
Fiennes		4 squadrons	2 off. men	13 off. men		
Penthièvre		4 squadrons	off. men	22 off. men		
Noailles		4 squadrons	3 off. men	8 off. men		
Berry	Mestre de Camp Marc René, Marquis de Voyer de Paulmy d'Argenson	4 squadrons	1 off. men	8 off. men		
Colonel-Général		4 squadrons	1 off. men	6 off. men		
Brancas		4 squadrons	1 off. men	2 off. men		
Mestre de Camps		4 squadrons	1 off. men	off. men		
d'Orleans		4 squadrons	off. men	off. men		
de Pons		4 squadrons	off. men	7 off. men		
Prince Camille		4 squadrons	1 off. men	4 off. men		
Dragons du Roi		4 squadrons	off. men	off. men		
Cuirassiers du Roi		4 squadrons	off. men	off. men		
Cavalrie du Roi		4 squadrons	off. men	off. men		
Clermont-Prince		4 squadrons	1 off. men	3 off. men		
Clermont-Tonnerre		4 squadrons	off. men	off. men		
Egmont			off. men	off. men		
Fitz-James		4 squadrons	11 off. or wounded	7 off. men		
Brienne			2 off. men	2 off. men		
Chabrillant		4 squadrons	1 off. men	off. men		
Royal Étranger		4 squadrons	off. men	1 off. men		
Talleyrand		4 squadrons	off. men	off. men		
			off. men	off. men		
French Artillery 90-110 guns, sources vary.	M. du Brocard	3 battalions 8 × 12-pounders 6 × 8-pounder 36 × 4-pounder 50 × 4-pounder Suédoise	4 off. 34 men	10 off. 73 men		
Fontenay		1 battalion	1 off. 13 men	4 off. 29 men		
Pumbeque		1 battalion		1 off.		
Richecourt		1 battalion	2 off. 21 men	5 off. 43 men		

== Order of Battle for the Army of the Pragmatic Allies of Britain, Hanover, the Dutch Republic and Austria at Fontenoy 1745 ==
The British army foot and cavalry regiments had a peacetime establishment, a wartime establishment, an effective strength and a field strength. Peacetime establishment was a much reduced strength that was increased during the war by Parliament. However, the wartime establishment was frequently unmet as there was always some variable number of purposely unfilled rank and file to provide the regiment with some flexible funding. The effective strength, therefore, was actual number of rank and file that was initially sent on campaign. The effective strength would immediately begin to vary as the campaign progressed due to sickness, wounds or death in battle, desertion, new reinforcement drafts, etc. and the resultant strengths at any given time are the field strengths. British foot regiments generally consisted of a single battalion made up of a variable number of companies, usually 9 or 10. Some foot regiments, such as the Guards, had more than one battalion but the battalions of a regiment rarely served together in the field. Cavalry regiments consisted of 1 to 4 squadrons.

The Historical memoirs of His late Royal Highness William-Augustus, duke of Cumberland explains in a foot note that, according to a return in 1749, for the 1st Foot Guards wartime establishment strength voted by Parliament was 3,080 while the effective strength was 2,689, the 2nd Foot Guards was 1,980 establishment and effective 1,842, the 3rd Foot Guards 1,980; effective 1,630. There were 3 battalions in the 1st Foot Guards, 2 of 9 companies and one of 10. As can be seen from the above, the average establishment strength of a battalion of the 1st Guards is slightly over 1,000 while the effective strength is about 895 and the 2nd is 990 and 921 while the 3rd is 895 and 815. For the entire army of 43,676 men voted by Parliament the effective strength was 38,200 in 1749.

As for other armies, historians often determine the army's strength based on an average strength for the battalion or squadron. In 1745 Parliament voted 28,107 men in Flanders consisting of: 2 troops of Horse Guards, 1 of Horse Grenadier Guards, 3 regiments of horse, six of dragoons; 21 regiments (battalions) of foot, 3 battalions of Foot Guards. This force, less four regiments of foot and one regiment of dragoons, is the British contingent at Fontenoy. Rolt gives an estimated strength for this force at Fontenoy as 21,000 consisting of 20 battalions of foot and 26 squadrons of horse. Colin is in close agreement with this estimate with a further breakdown of the total with 16,170 foot in 20 battalions and 4,656 horse in 26 squadrons, giving an average battalion strength of 808 men and an average squadron strength of 179. Skrine, who gives impossibly high field strengths for French foot battalions, uses remarkably low average field strengths for British battalions and squadrons: 650 per battalion and 150 per squadron by which he arrives at his total for the British contingent of 16,900 (13,000 foot and 3,900 horse).

Unit	Commander	Complement	Killed	Wounded	Missing	Total Losses
Pragmatic Army	William Augustus, Duke of Cumberland	50,000; Infantry in 52 battalions Cavalry in 85 squadrons 93 guns: 47 British, 34 Dutch, 12 Hanoverian				7,370; In addition, 4,200 captured: 2,368 wounded; 3,000 stragglers 40 cannon

=== British contingent ===
Unit	Commander	Complement	Killed	Wounded	Missing	Total Losses
British contingent of Allied Right Wing	William Augustus, Duke of Cumberland	21,000; 16,170 foot in 20 battalions 4,656 horse in 26 squadrons	48 off. 1,442 men	153 off. 1,926 men	16 off. 295 men	3,879 men 21 guns
British Foot	Lieutenant-General Sir John Ligonier					
Guards Brigade	Colonel George Churchill (WIA)					
1st Foot Guards		1 battalion	4 off. 85 men	7 off. 142 men		
2nd Foot Guards		1 battalion	3 off. 112 men	8 off. 116 men		
3rd Foot Guards	Lieutenant Colonel Robert Carpenter †	1 battalion	4 off. 105 men	7 off. 131 men		
Ponsonby's Brigade	Major-General Henry Ponsonby †					
Royal Scots (1st Foot)		1 battalion	87 men	8 off. 83 men	8 men	
Scots Fusiliers(21st Foot)		1 battalion	2 off. 201 men	9 off. 144 men	3 off. 15 men	
Handaside's (31st Foot)		1 battalion	4 off. 139 men	5 off. 100 men	13 men	
Onslow's Brigade	Onslow					
Onslow's (8th Foot)		1 battalion	16 men	7 off. 83 men	31 men	
Rothe's/Sempill's (25th Foot)		1 battalion	1 off. 59 men	10 off. 76 men	13 men	
Johnson's (33rd Foot)		1 battalion	6 off. 42 men	12 off. 84 men	30 men	
Howard's (19th Foot)		1 battalion	2 off. 17 men	8 off. 70 men	13 men	
Howard's Brigade	Major-General Charles Howard					
Howard's (3rd Foot)	Lieutenant-Colonel George Howard	1 battalion	1 off. 11 men	2 off. 32 men	8 men	
Welsh Fusiliers (23rd Foot)		1 battalion	4 off. 185 men	10 off. 77 men	8 off. 39 men	
Skelton's (32nd Foot)		1 battalion	16 men	5 off. 100 men	1 off. 17 men	
Bland's Brigade	Humphrey Bland					
Sowle's (11th Foot)		1 battalion	4 off. 49 men	2 off. 112 men	1 off. 46 men	
Bragg's (28th Foot)	Lieutenant-Colonel; Lord George Sackville	1 battalion	1 off. 27 men	9 off. 76 men	1 off. 12 men	
Skelton's Brigade	Brigadier-General Henry Skelton					
Cholmondeley's (34th Foot)	Colonel James Cholmondeley	1 battalion	off. 27 men	6 off. 84 men	28 men	
Bligh's (20th Foot)		1 battalion	1 off. 28 men	5 off. 35 men		
Ingoldsby's Brigade	Colonel James Ingoldsby					
Duroure's (12th Foot)	Colonel Scipio Duroure †	1 battalion	7 off. 153 men	12 off. 149 men	3 men	
Pulteney's (13th Foot)		1 battalion	1 off. 37 men	4 off. 41 men	10 men	
Sempill's Highlanders (42nd Foot)	Colonel Sir Robert Munro	1 battalion	2 off. 30 men	3 off. 88 men	13 men	
British Horse	Lieutenant-General; James Campbell †					
Earl of Rothes' Brigade						
2nd Dragoons (Scots Greys)		3 squadrons	14 men	1 off. 11 men		
Hawley's Royal Dragoons (1st Royal Dragoons)		3 squadrons	14 men	4 off. 31 men		
Bland's King's Own Dragoons (3rd Hussars)			9 men	2 off. 14 men	1 off. 7 men	
Cope's Queen's Own Dragoons (7th Hussars)		3 squadrons	1 off. 10 men	5 off. 35 men	3 men	
Stair's 6th Dragoons (6th (Inniskilling) Dragoons)		3 squadrons	1 off. 3 men	11 men	3 men	
Brigade						
3rd troop Horse Guards (Life Guards)			4 men	1 off. 14 men		
4th troop Horse Guards (Life Guards)			2 men	2 off. 12 men		
2nd troop Horse Grenadiers (Life Guards)			4 men	4 off. 10 men		
Blues (Royal Horse Guards)		3 squadrons	10 men	5 off. 39 men		
Honeywood's (1st Dragoon Guards)			7 men	1 off. 4 men	1 man	
Ligonier's Black Horse (8th Horse)	Lieutenant-Colonel Daniel Webb	2 squadrons	3 men	1 off. 4 men	1 man	
British Artillery	Colonel Jonathan Lewis	47 guns: 10 6-pounders, 27 3-pounders, 6 1&1/2-pounders, 4 8-inch howitzers				
			1 off. 4 men	23 men		

=== Hanoverian contingent ===
Unit	Commander	Complement	Killed	Wounded	Missing	Total Losses
Hanoverian contingent of Allied Right Wing	General Zastrow	7,000	17 off. 468 men	77 off. 1,125 men	54 men	1,741
Hanoverian Foot	General Ilten	4,135 in 5 battalions	12 off. 420 men	38 off. 912 men	50 men	
Rgt. Böschlanger		1 battalion	156	201	20	
Rgt. Zastrow		1 battalion	90	209		
Rgt. Sporken		1 battalion	65	214		
Rgt. Oberg		1 battalion	54	155	28	
Rgt. Campen		1 battalion	67	141	2	
Hanoverian Horse		2,840	4 off. 64 men	28 off. 201 men	3 men	
Rgt. d'Acerre		2 squadrons				
Rgt. Leib Han		2 squadrons				
Rgt. Von Aldeleben		4 squadrons				
Rgt. Von Dachenhausen		2 squadrons				
Rgt. Von der Bussche		4 squadrons				
Rgt. Von Montigny		2 squadrons				
Rgt. Von Wendt		4 squadrons				
Hanoverian Artillery		12 3-pounder guns	1 off. 3 men	2 off. 12 men	1 man	

=== Austrian contingent ===
Unit	Commander	Complement	Killed	Wounded	Missing	Total Losses
Austrian contingent	Marshal Joseph Königsegg	2,000				420
Austrian Horse		1,650 in 11 squadrons	23	47	11	81
Dragoons de Ligne		8 squadrons				
Rgt. Karolyi Hussars		3 squadrons, 450 troopers				
Austrian Foot						
2 Freikorps Companies		250 men				

=== Dutch contingent ===
Unit	Commander	Complement	Killed	Wounded	Missing	Total Losses
Dutch contingent of the Allied Left Wing	Karl August, Prince of Waldeck	22,000	563	757	221	1541
Dutch Foot	General Isaac Cronström		18 off. 485 men	44 off. 649 men	1 off. 202 men	
Regt. Garde te Voet		2 battalions	1 off. 11 men	13 men	1 off. 5 men	
Regt. Waldeck (German)		1 battalion	1 off. 22 men	3 off. 47 men		
Regt. Cronström (National)		1 battalion	41 men	2 off. 37 men	2 men	
Combined grenadier battalion Van Dorth		1 battalion	32 men	6 off. 33 men	4 men	
Regt. Aylva (National)		1 battalion	1 off. 10 men	2 off. 44 men		
Regt. Smissaert (Walloon)		1 battalion	1 off. 18 men	1 off. 10 men	4 men	
Regt. Schaumburg-Lippe (National)		1 battalion	2 off. 13 men	47 men	21 men	
Regt. Bentinck (National)		1 battalion	13 men	2 off. 25 men	7 men	
Regt. De Constant-Rebecque (Swiss)		3 battalions	1 off. 58 men	6 off. 119 men	4 men	
Regt. Buddenbroek (National)		1 battalion	1 off. 24 men	3 off. 67 men	11 men	
Regt. Bronckhorst (National)		1 battalion	18 men	1 off. 22 men	21 men	
Regt. Oranje-Vriesland (National)		1 battalion	2 off. 28 men	3 off. 35 men	39 men	
Regt. Oranje-Groningen (National)		1 battalion	2 off. 24 men	4 off. 56 men	36 men	
Regt. Salis (Swiss)		2 battalions	3 off. 59 men	2 off. 58 men	28 men	
Regt. Sturler (Swiss)		2 battalions	1 off. 36 men	4 off. 45 men		
Regt. Broekhuysen (National)		1 battalion	1 off. 44 men	3 off. 45 men	3 men	
Combined grenadier battalion Van Rijssel		1 battalion	1 off. 64 men	2 off. 37 men	47 men	
Unnamed Grenadier units		4 battalions				
Dutch Horse			3 off. 57 men	3 off. 61 men	18 men	
Regt. Garde-Dragonders		5 squadrons	2 off. 12 men	1 off. 11 men	9 men	
Regt. Hesse-Homburg		3 squadrons	2 men	2 men	4 men	
Regt. Ginkel		3 squadrons	2 men	2 men		
Regt. Hop		3 squadrons	1 men	5 men		
Regt. Schack		3 squadrons	1 men	3 men	2 men	
Regt. Sandouville		3 squadrons	2 men	2 men		
Regt. Hœuft van Oyen Carabiniers		2 squadrons	6 men	14 men		
Regt. Schlippenbach Dragoons		5 squadrons	20 men	3 off. 18 men	1 man	
Regt. Lynden		3 squadrons	1 off. 9 men	3 men	1 man	
Regt. Buys		1 squadron			1 man	
Regt. Nassau-la Leq		5 squadrons	2 men	1 man		
Regt. Rechteren-Overijssel		3 squadrons				
Dutch Artillery		34 guns: 24 3-pounders; 6 6-pounders; 4 howitzers				

== Bibliography ==
- Black, Jeremy (1998). Britain as a Military Power, 1688–1815. Routledge. ISBN 1-85728-772-X.
- Boyle P. The Irish Brigade at Fontenoy from The Irish Ecclesiastical Record, Vol. XVII, 1905, Dublin.
- Broglie, Albert le Duc de. La Journée De Fontenoy, Paris, 1891.
- Chandler, David G. The Art of Warfare in the Age of Marlborough. Spellmount Limited. 1990. ISBN 0-946771-42-1.
- Colin, Jean Lambert Alphonse. Les Campagnes du Maréchal de Saxe, 3 volumes. Paris: R. Chapelot, 1901–06, Volumes 1-3: Volume 3 Fontenoy is divided into 2 parts: Colin's narrative of the battle and the some 500 pages of the Piéces Justificatives which are contemporary accounts of the battle, records, returns, letters, etc.. Both parts have their own pagination. Much of this is available in the Revue d'histoire rédigée à l'État-major de l'armée, Section historique, 1905/01 (A7, VOL17, N49)-1905/03 (A7, VOL17, N51). Online:
- d' Espagnac, Jean-Baptiste-Joseph Damarzit de Sahuguet. Histoire de Maurice, comte de Saxe, duc de Courlande et de Semigalle, Volume 2, Paris, MDCCLXXV.
- Duncan, Francis. History of the Royal Regiment of Artillery, London, 1879, Vol.1.
- Fortescue, J. W. A History of the British Army, Macmillan, London, 1899, Vol. II.
- Hamilton, Lieutenant-General F.W..Origin and History of the First or Grenadier Guards, London, 1874, Vol. II.
- Mackinnon, Daniel. Origin and services of the Coldstream Guards, London 1883, Vol.I.
- O'Callaghan, John Cornelius. History of the Irish Brigades in the Service of France, London, 1870.
- Pajol, Charles Pierre Victor. Les Guerres sous Louis XV', Tome III, Adamant Media Corp. 2006, ISBN 0-543-74378-0.
- Pichat, Henry. La Campagne du Maréchal de Saxe dans les Flandres, Paris, 1909.
- Rolt, Richard. Historical memoirs of His late Royal Highness William-Augustus, duke of Cumberland, London, 1768.
- Skrine, Francis Henry. Fontenoy and Great Britain's Share in the War of the Austrian Succession 1741–48. London, 1906.
- Townshend, Sir Charles Vere Ferrers. The military life of Field-Marshal George first marquess Townshend, London, 1901.
- Weigley, Russell F (1991). The Age of Battles: The Quest for Decisive Warfare from Breitenfeld to Waterloo. Indiana University Press. ISBN 0-253-36380-2.
- White, Jon Manchip. Marshal of France, The Life and Times of Maurice de Saxe, Rand McNally & Co., 1962.
- Geerdink-Schaftenaar, Marc. For Orange and the States. The Army of the Dutch Republic, 1713-1772. Part I: Infantry, Helion and Company, 2018. ISBN 978-1-911512-15-8
