= List of Italian generals who died during the First World War =

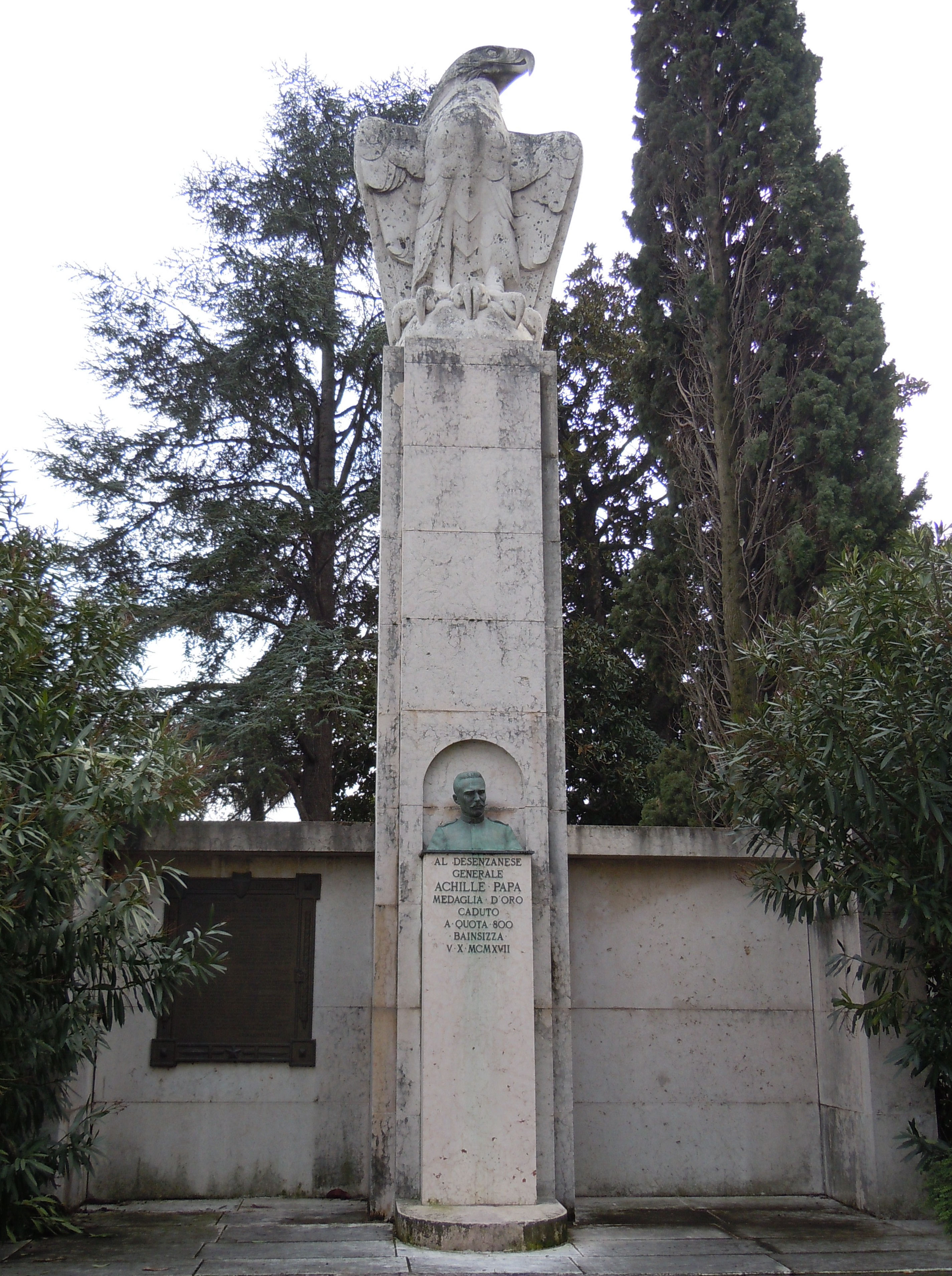
Monument to Major General Achille Papa, who died 5 October 1917

This is a list of Italian generals who died during the First World War. Italy joined the war on the Allied side in 1915 and fought until the end of hostilities in 1918. The Albo dei Caduti Italiani della Grande Guerra (Italian: "Honour Roll of Great War Dead") lists the details of the 540,401 Italian soldiers who died as late as when peace treaties formally ending the war were being concluded. The list includes those killed in action, died of wounds, or from illness.

== Context ==
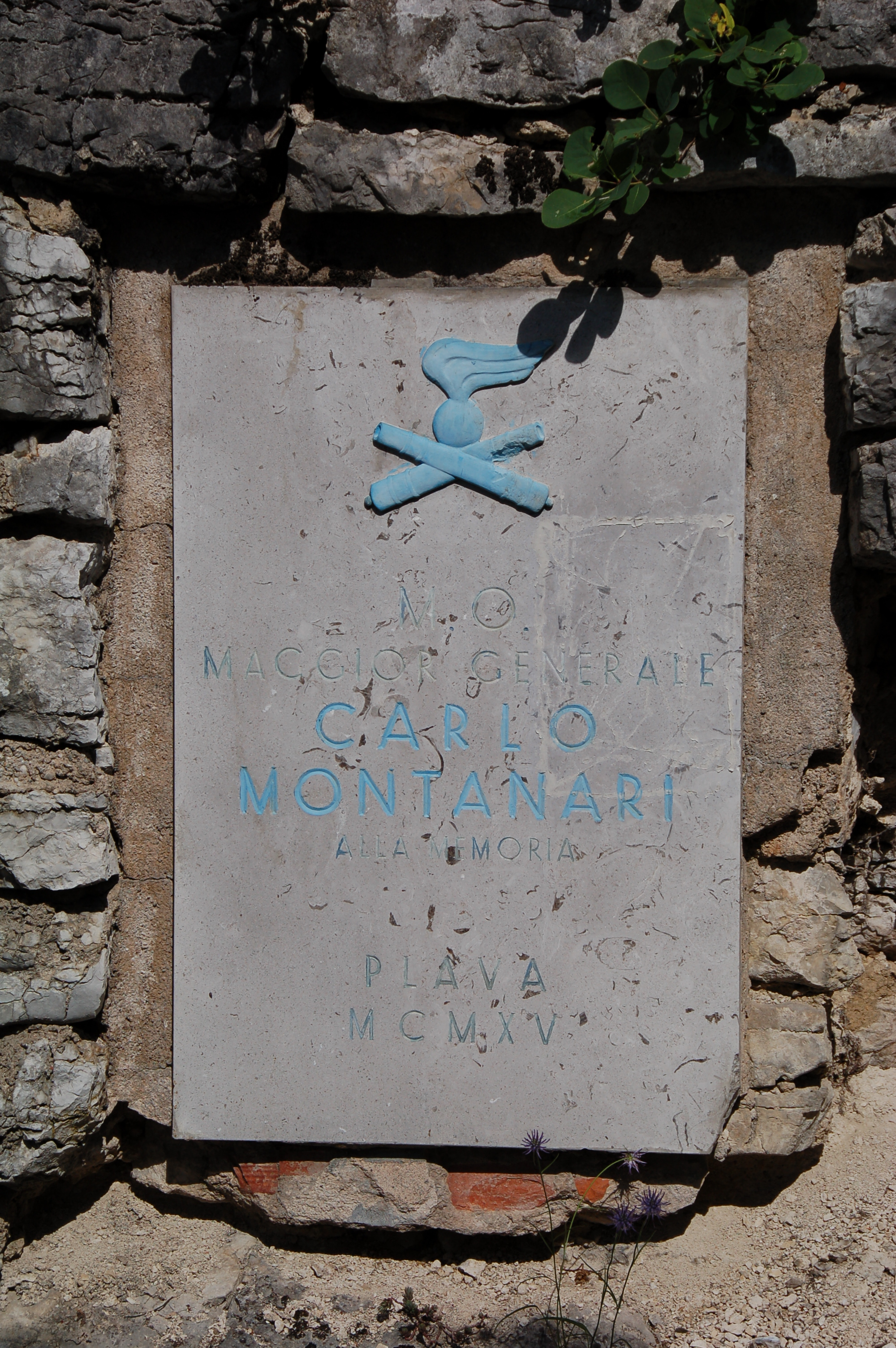
Memorial plaque for Major General Carlo Montanari (died 9 November 1915)

=== General ranks in the Italian Army ===
In 1914, when the First World War began and Italy chose not to join the rest of the Central Powers in war against the Allies, the Italian Army had four ranks of general (in ascending order of seniority):

- Major general
- Lieutenant general
- Army corps general
- General of the army

In 1915, the year Italy joined the Allies, grades were introduced to the rank structure to make the command levels clearer. Further ranks were added in 1918:

- Brigadier general (introduced in 1918 by conversion from the rank of colonel in command of a brigade)
- Major general
  - in command of a brigade (introduced in 1915)
  - in command of a division (introduced in 1918)
- Lieutenant general
  - in command of a division (introduced in 1915)
  - in command of an army corps (introduced in 1915)
  - in command of an army (introduced in 1918)
  - chief of staff of the army (introduced in 1918)
- General of the army

=== Army size and casualties ===
In early 1915 the Italian army had a theoretical strength of 1,058,000 men in seventeen army corps (beneath the corps were 44 division-sized formations). Only 2 of the army corps were near full strength and only 15,858 of the army's 45,099 officers were professional career soldiers. By late 1917 the army had grown to 2.9 million men in 70 divisions and by 1918 had 186,000 officers (though still only 22,000 professionals).

The Italian army chief of staff Luigi Cadorna had a reputation for ruthlessness; by the time he was sacked in late 1917 he had dismissed 217 generals and hundreds more junior officers. Losses also came from other causes, of the 14 major generals who left the army in June 1916, six were dismissed, one was wounded and seven left due to illness. Casualties among officers were high in general, 16,867 died during the war, a ratio of 8.2%.

Disease took a higher toll on the Italian army than many of its contemporaries; an estimated 30-35% of deaths were caused by disease. This figure ran at around 13% in the French Army while only one German soldier succumbed to illness for every ten combat deaths. Malaria was a constant problem and affected up to 25% of Italian soldiers in 1917. Pulmonary tuberculosis was also a major killer, causing 20% of all Italian Army deaths by illness. Periodic epidemics of cholera and typhus swept through the Italian lines, causing thousands of deaths at a time, and from 1918 Spanish flu outbreaks occurred.

== Wartime deaths ==
The Albo dei Caduti Italiani della Grande Guerra (Italian: "Honour Roll of Great War Dead") published by the Ministry of War lists the details of the 540,401 Italian soldiers who died between 1915 and 1920. The work to draw up the roll was complex and was interrupted by the Second World War, it was compiled in 28 volumes between 1926 and 1964. The list includes those considered to have "died for their country" in a war-related context and includes those killed or missing in action as well as those that died from disease, accident or suicide. It excludes those executed by the Italian army (around 1,000 men), those who died in Italian prisons (around 7,000 men), those who died from self harm in an attempt to avoid service by maiming (around 1,000 men) and those who deserted and were not later killed in battle or awarded a bravery medal (around 5,000 men). It also excludes soldiers who fought in the Italian army but were not resident in Italy (though did include around 3,000 of these men by mistake). Demographer Alessio Fornasin estimates that around 18,000 soldiers were excluded from the roll by mistake or lack of documentation and estimates a total loss of around 558,000 men. Other estimates such as by the War Reparations Commission run as high as 650,000, though Fornasin considers these to overstate deaths in prisoner of war camps and in the post-armistice era.

Although the Italian military effort reached a peak in men deployed in 1917 with the 10th, 11th and 12th battles of the Isonzo and the Battle of the Piave River. War between the Allied Powers and Bulgaria ended with the 29 September 1918 Armistice of Salonica and with the Ottoman Empire ended with the 30 October Armistice of Mudros. Italy signed the Armistice of Villa Giusti ending hostilities with Austria-Hungary on 3 November 1918 and the Armistice of Compiègne which ended the war with Germany on 11 November 1918. Although the conflict ended part way through 1918 it still accounted for the most deaths of any of the war years, because of the arrival of Spanish flu. This list of 27 generals takes the armistice with Germany as the end of the war. By comparison with other armies Laurent Guillemot lists 41 French generals killed in the war (by a wider definition including non-combat related deaths and deaths as late as 1923 Gérard Gehin lists 81). Guillemot, using his more limited definition considers 76 British generals, 2 Belgian and 2 Romanian generals were killed in the war and, on the opposing side, 70 German, 40 Austro-Hungarian and one Ottoman general killed.

Image	Name	Rank	Command	Date of death	Place of death	Cause of death	Ref.
	Carlo Montanari	Major general	Forli Brigade	9 November 1915	Battles of the Isonzo, Austro-Italian frontier	Died of wounds	
	Ferruccio Trombi	Major general	Livorno Brigade	28 November 1915	Battles of the Isonzo, Austro-Italian frontier	Died of wounds	
	Gabriele Berardi	Major general	Sassari Brigade	15 December 1915	Monte San Michele, Italy	Died of wounds	
	Serafino Dall'Olio	Major general	Engineers, XVIII Army Corps	25 April 1916	Field Hospital No. 75	Died of wounds	
	Marcello Prestinari	Major general	Etna Brigade	10 June 1916	64th Medical Section	Died of wounds	
	Francesco Berardi	Major general	Milan Brigade	8 July 1916	Field Hospital No. 53	Died of wounds	
	Antonio Edoardo Chinotto	Lieutenant general		25 August 1916	Udine, Italy	Illness	
	Oreste Bandini	Lieutenant general	Italian troops in the occupation of Albania	11 December 1916	Valona, (Vlorë, modern day Albania)	Killed in action (sinking of the Regina Margherita)	
	Ugo Bagnani	Major general	Italian mission to British forces in France	7 February 1917	France	Illness	
	Alessandro Ricordi	Major general	Murge Brigade	28 May 1917	Field Hospital No. 46	Died of wounds	
	Fileno Briganti	Major general	15th Infantry Brigade	5 July 1917	Fontevivo, Italy	Effects of poison gas	
	Tommaso Monti	Brigadier general	Forli Bigade	29 August 1917	Monte San Gabriele (Škabrijel, modern day Slovenia)	Died of wounds	
	Antonino Cascino	Major general	8th Division	29 September 1917	City of Milan Mobile Surgical Hospital	Died of wounds	
	Achille Papa	Major general	44th Infantry Division	5 October 1917	Banjšice Plateau, Austrian Empire	Died of wounds	
	Luigi Franchini	Major general	Porto Maurizio Brigade	15 November 1917	Florence, Italy	Illness	
	Cesare Vittorio Delmastro	Lieutenant general	Genoa Army Corps	14 January 1918	Genoa, Italy	Illness	
	Imerio Gazzola	Lieutenant general	23rd Division	29 May 1918	Zero Branco, Italy	Illness	
	Umberto Fadini	Major general	Artillery, XXIII Army Corps	8 July 1918	Piave river, Italy	Died of wounds	
	Allegro Pavia	Brigadier general	Verona Brigade	22 July 1918	Albania	Illness	
	Filippo Masperi	Brigadier general	Reggio Brigade	8 August 1918	Rome, Italy	Illness	
	Achille Borghi	Lieutenant general	Guardia di Finanza	10 August 1918	Rome, Italy	Illness	
	Paolo Maioli	Brigadier general	Artillery, 69th Division	20 August 1918	27th Medical Section	Died of wounds	
	Romolo Mosca-Riatel	Brigadier general	Piacenza Brigade	9 September 1918	Turin, Italy	Illness	
	Alessandro Vanzetti	Brigadier general	Verona Brigade	27 September 1918	Albania	Illness	
	Carmelo Scardino	Major general		12 October 1918	Cosenza, Italy	Illness	
	Giulio Pozzolo	Brigadier general	10th Division	17 October 1918	Turin, Italy	Illness	
	Vittorio Luigi Alfieri	Lieutenant general	XXVI Army Corps	8 November 1918	Musestre, Italy	Illness	

== Post-armistice deaths ==
The Albo dei Caduti Italiani della Grande Guerra lists Italian soldiers who died up to 1920. This includes those that died after the armistices but before all of the peace treaties were concluded. Italy was a participant in the Paris Peace Conference (1919–1920) which sought to establish terms for the peace treaties that ended the war. The 28 June 1919 Treaty of Versailles established peace with Germany; the Treaty of Saint-Germain-en-Laye of 10 September formally ended the war with Austria; the 4 June 1920 Treaty of Trianon ended the war with Hungary and the 27 November 1919 Treaty of Neuilly-sur-Seine accomplished the same with Bulgaria. A ratified peace treaty with Turkey, the successor state of the Ottoman Empire, was not achieved until the 24 July 1923 Treaty of Lausanne.

Image	Name	Rank	Command	Date of death	Place of death	Cause of death	Ref.
	Augusto Bianchi	Brigadier general	General Staff	2 December 1918	Bologna, Italy	Effects of poison gas	
	Carlo Cerillo	Major general	Artillery, XXIX Army Corps	26 December 1918	Naples, Italy	Illness	
	Roberto Diotaiuti	Major general	General Staff	31 January 1919	Florence, Italy	War injury	
	Gioacchino Nastasi	Brigadier general	Toscana Brigade	23 August 1919	Bari, Italy	Illness	
	Giorgio Cigliana	Lieutenant general	Florence Army Corps	8 October 1919	Florence, Italy	Illness	
	Carlo Carrara	Brigadier general	Arezzo Brigade	13 March 1920	Bologna, Italy	Illness	
	Enrico Gotti	Brigadier general	Puglia Brigade	6 June 1920	Albania	Died of wounds	
	Vittorio Fiorone	Major general	General Staff	16 October 1920	Genoa, Italy	Illness	

== See also ==
- List of French generals who died during the First World War
- List of German generals who died during the First World War
- List of generals of the British Empire who died during the First World War
