= National Office for Veterans and Victims of War =

French governmental agency

National Office for Combatant and Victims of War
- Office national des combattants et des victimes de guerre (ONaCVG)

Agency overview
- Preceding agencies: Office national des mutilés, combattants, victimes de la guerre et pupilles de la nation; Office National des Mutilés et Réformés
- Motto: Memory and solidarity
- Agency executive: Véronique Peaucelle-Delelis, Director General
- Parent department: Ministry of the Armies
- Website: www.onac-vg.fr

The National Office for Combatants and Victims of War (ONaCVG), formerly the National Office for Veterans and Victims of War (ONAC-VG), is a French public administrative body under the supervision of the Ministry of the Armed Forces and Veterans Affairs. Founded in 1916, its mission is to provide recognition, reparation, solidarity and remembrance for combatants, veterans and victims of war. It operates under the Code of Military Invalidity Pensions and War Victims (CPMIVG). Its head office has been located at the Hôtel national des Invalides in Paris since the Second World War.

History

The first body to be established was the National Office for War Disabled and Discharged Soldiers (ONMR), created by the ministerial order of 2 March 1916, during the First World War[alpha 1],[1]. At the time, it was an autonomous interministerial public body run by a board of directors. The law of 27 July 1917 then created the National Office for Wards of the Nation (ONPN)[alpha 2], and the law of 19 December 1926 established the National Combatants' Office (ONC)[alpha 3]. In 1933 and 1934, these three bodies were merged in stages to form the National Office for the War Disabled, Combatants, Victims of War and Wards of the Nation. In 1946, this body took over the social services of the Ministry of Prisoners, Deportees and Refugees, and from then on was named the National Office for Veterans and Victims of War. Since 1991, it has also provided assistance to victims of terrorist acts.

In December 2022, ONAC-VG was targeted by a cyberattack. According to some experts, it was of Russian origin, coming ten months after Russia invaded Ukraine. In an op-ed published on 19 January 2023, Vice Admiral Patrick Chevallereau pointed to "former French servicemen [who] are serving the Kremlin's interests"[2].

From 1 January 2023, the body was renamed the National Office for Combatants and Victims of War by Law No. 2022-297 of 2 March 2022 on the combatant community[3]. It kept the acronym ONAC-VG to make it easier to pronounce, but with the "A" in lower case: ONaC-VG.

Missions

ONaCVG's work is organised around three main missions: recognition and reparation; solidarity; and remembrance and citizenship. It carries out these missions for around 1.81 million beneficiaries (2023 estimate), a number expected to fall to about 1.38 million by 2027. It does so through a network of local offices in every department of mainland France and the overseas territories, in French Polynesia and New Caledonia, and in Algeria and Morocco.

Recognition and reparation

This mission covers the award of the combatant's card, the title of recognition of the Nation, veteran and war victim titles, and honorary designations such as "Died for France", "Died in deportation", "Died in the service of the Nation" and "Died in the service of the Republic". It also includes managing the combatant's pension (renamed the combatant's recognition allowance by Decree No. 2023-534 of 29 June 2023), the invalidity card, related rights such as pilgrimages to graves, and the recognition allowance for Harkis.

Solidarity

The Office's social action is carried out by its local offices. It provides personalised follow-up for beneficiaries, especially the wounded. It also applies the status of ward of the Nation and the status of ward of the Republic, funds career retraining, and provides various forms of financial assistance (emergency aid, grants, social loans).

Remembrance and citizenship

ONaCVG is the main body delivering the Ministry of the Armed Forces' remembrance policy. It promotes ten major sites of national remembrance, listed in the order of 20 March 2014. It also runs educational activities (school competitions, exhibitions, workshops, testimonies) aimed especially at younger generations.

Organisation

The administrative and financial organisation of the Office is set out in the Code of Military Invalidity Pensions and War Victims[4].

The Director General is appointed by decree in the Council of Ministers.

The Office is run by a board of directors, which sets its general policy and is chaired by the minister responsible for veterans and victims of war. The board has thirty-one members divided into three groups.

The first group consists of one member of the National Assembly and one senator, appointed by the President of the National Assembly and the President of the Senate respectively, together with representatives of the administration.

The second group represents veterans and victims of war, chosen from among the categories of the Office's beneficiaries.

The third group represents national foundations and associations working on remembrance and citizenship.

The board also includes two representatives of the Office's staff.

The Office's departmental and territorial offices report both to the Office's Director General and to the State's representative. Their role is to carry out the functions assigned to the National Office within their department or territory.

ONaCVG's current organisation is set out in the order of 9 December 2025, which came into force on 1 January 2026 (it repeals and replaces the order of 21 March 2023)[5]. The Office consists of a head office and a decentralised network of local offices covering every department of mainland France and the overseas territories, French Polynesia, New Caledonia, and Algeria and Morocco. These local offices deal directly with beneficiaries day to day.

At head office level, the Office's work is divided among several departments, each matching one of its historical missions[5].

Recognition and reparation

In principle, this is the oldest department, as it directly continues the 1915 laws that created the "Died for France" (MPF) status. It processes cards, titles and honorary designations: the combatant's card, the title of recognition of the Nation, veteran titles for the Second World War, Indochina and Algeria, and the designations "Died for France", "Died in deportation", "Died in the service of the Nation" and "Died in the service of the Republic". For the last of these, the department itself acts as rapporteur before the committee that gives an opinion. It also processes applications for the combatant's recognition allowance and for covering the cost of pilgrimages to the graves of those who "Died for France" or "Died in deportation". Together with the Repatriates department, it handles compensation due under the law of 23 February 2022 on Harkis[6]. It also prepares, for signature by the Secretary General of the Government, compensation files for orphans of victims of antisemitic persecution or acts of barbarity during the Second World War. Finally, it runs the national freephone line "ONaCVG is listening", open since June 2020. By 1 July 2023, more than 9.19 million combatant's cards had been awarded in total, including 268,049 for overseas operations (OPEX), or nearly 3% of the total[7].

Repatriates

Since 1 January 2015, this department has run the "one-stop shop for Repatriates and Harkis", which centralises administrative management following a July 2013 decision of the Interministerial Committee for the Modernisation of Public Action. It manages and monitors the dedicated budget (action 7 of programme 169) and advises institutional partners on welcoming and guiding repatriates. It includes the national mission on supplementary measures for Harkis and repatriates. This mission manages the recognition allowance for former Harkis and their widows who have not remarried (€21.77 million, 3,532 beneficiaries at the end of August 2023), the life annuity paid to surviving spouses and former spouses (€19.92 million, 1,888 beneficiaries at the end of August 2023)[7], assistance for surviving spouses, service certification for former auxiliaries, and support for children who lived in the camps and forestry hamlets (decree of 28 December 2018)[8]. The law of 23 February 2022 created a compensation scheme for harm caused by the degrading conditions in which they were received. On the recommendation of the National Independent Commission on Harkis (CNIH), it was extended to 45 additional sites[6].

Solidarity

This department carries out the Office's social action, the part of its work most directly connected to beneficiaries' daily lives. It initiates and follows adoption procedures for wards of the Nation, processes applications for the status of ward of the Republic and submits them for signature by the Prime Minister, and ensures support for victims of terrorist acts. It builds partnerships with associations to support these policies and manages the related budgets. These include the solidarity funds from the Bleuet de France, a fund created in 1925 at the Institution nationale des Invalides. It was part of the Office from 1991 to 2023 and has since become an independent endowment fund, but its money continues to finance ONaCVG's social action. The social action grant paid by the Ministry of the Armed Forces to ONaCVG is set at €25 million. In 2022, 7,790 financial grants were awarded to wards of the Nation who were minors or in education, totalling more than €4.80 million, a 21% increase on 2021[7].

Support for the wounded

This department became independent more recently. It reflects the closer ties between the Office and the armed forces as OPEX generations take over from older generations of veterans. It helps design measures for the recovery and social and professional rehabilitation of the wounded. It works directly with the armed forces' general staffs, the directorates and services of the Ministry of the Armed Forces and Veterans Affairs, and the Directorate General of the National Gendarmerie. No other department in the Office has this kind of institutional link. It also manages the Bleuet de France funds set aside for rehabilitation projects for wounded service members and veterans[5].

Remembrance and citizenship

This department designs activities to pass on remembrance to the general public and, above all, to younger generations. These include school competitions ("Little Artists of Remembrance", "Remembrance Bubbles"), exhibitions, educational workshops, testimonies, serious games and citizenship rallies. It sets policy for promoting major remembrance sites, national necropolises and war graves. This policy role should not be confused with the operational management of maintenance work, which is handled by another service (see below). The regional remembrance officers report to this department[5].

War graves, military civil records and exhumation mission[5]

Besides its social and remembrance work, ONaCVG has a specific legal role regarding military graves. This role is based on the CPMIVG, which in this respect is an exception to ordinary funeral law.

Legal basis. The law of 2 July 1915, codified in Article L. 511-1 of the CPMIVG, introduced the designation "Died for France" (MPF) in the civil records of service members and civilians who died in wartime operations[9]. The law of 29 December 1915 (Article L. 522-1 of the CPMIVG) established the principle of perpetual burial for service members who died for France. They are buried in national necropolises or military plots in municipal cemeteries, and the State is responsible for their upkeep (Article L. 522-6)[10]. In addition, the Finance Act of 31 July 1920 (Articles L. 521-1 et seq.) gave families the right to have the body returned to them[11].

Article L. 611-3 of the CPMIVG expressly gives ONaCVG responsibility for maintaining, restoring and promoting war graves in mainland France, Algeria and Morocco. In the overseas departments and territories, similar procedures are handled by the armed forces' commissariat directorates[12]. A ruling by the Paris Administrative Court on 25 March 2024 (case No. 2207291) confirmed the scope of this special regime. It overturned a mayor's refusal to authorise the exhumation of an MPF soldier, on the grounds that under Article R. 521-8 of the CPMIVG, only ONaCVG representatives can decide on exhumations and transfers of the bodies of service members who "Died for France". This excludes the mayor's funeral police powers under Article L. 2213-8 of the General Code of Local Authorities[13].

War grave maintenance and restoration sectors. These decentralised services, defined in Title VII of the order of 9 December 2025[5], maintain and restore war graves. They may also support major sites of national remembrance, help prepare sites for ceremonies, and help ensure the accuracy of data in the military civil records.

Military civil records mission. This decentralised mission with national scope processes and verifies the civil record data of deceased combatants, especially those designated "Died for France". It works with the grave maintenance sectors and the exhumation mission. It also manages grants for maintaining and restoring war memorials, and handles requests to change or replace grave plaques in cemeteries. When the exhumation mission identifies a body, it carries out the research needed to find the family so they can exercise their right to have the body returned[5].

Exhumation mission. Created as a decentralised mission with national scope (Article 19 of the order of 9 December 2025) and reporting to the Deputy Director, the exhumation mission handles exhumations, their protocol and administrative management, and the analysis of combatants' remains found in France that fall under the Office's responsibility. It coordinates scientific work with specialised laboratories and maintains relations with the relevant international institutions. The CPMIVG gives ONaCVG a duty to protect military graves regardless of nationality, so the Office is the first point of contact for any case involving military human remains found in France. When the deceased is a foreign service member covered by an international agreement, the exhumation mission acts as the link between the institutions involved[5].

== See also ==
- Bleuet de France
- Military history of France
- France in World War I
- France in World War II
