= List of German generals who died during the First World War =

List of German generals who died in the First World War

This list includes all officers of general rank who while severed in the German Empire forces during the First World War. During this period general officers were those who held the rank of Generalfeldmarschall, General, Generalleutnant, Generalmajor, Generaloberst, or General der Infanterie.

== Wartime deaths ==
Image	Name	Rank	Command	Date of Death	Place of Death	Causes of Death	Ref.
	Prince Friedrich of Saxe-Meiningen	Generalmajor	X Reserve Corps	August 23, 1914	German invasion of Belgium,Tarcienne, Walcourt, Belgium	Killed in Action	
	Otto von Emmich	General der Infanterie	X Army Corps, Army of the Meuse	December 22, 1915	Hanover, Kingdom of Prussia, German Empire	Illness	
	Colmar Freiherr von der Goltz	Generalfeldmarschall and Mushir	Sixth Army	April 19, 1916	Baghdad, Ottoman Empire	Illness/poison	
	Helmuth von Moltke the Younger	Generaloberst	1st Guards Infantry Brigade, 1st Guards Infantry Division	June 18, 1916	Berlin, Province of Brandenburg, Kingdom of Prussia, German Empire	Illness	
	Maximilian von Prittwitz	Generaloberst	8th Division, XVI Corps, Eighth Army	March 29, 1917	Berlin, Kingdom of Prussia, German Empire	Ilness	
	Moritz von Bissing	Generaloberst	Gardes du Corps, 29th Division, VII Army Corps	April 18, 1917	Trois Fontaines near Brussels, Belgium	Illness	
	Karl von Wenninger	Generalleutnant	Bavarian Cavalry Division, 3rd Royal Bavarian Division, XVIII Reserve Corps	September 8, 1917	Battle of Mărășești, Muncelu, Străoane, Vrancea County, Romania	Killed in Action	
	Albert von Berrer	Generalleutnant	31st Infantry Division, 51st Corps	October 28, 1917	Battle of Caporetto, San Gottardo, Kingdom of Italy	Killed in Action	
	Hermann von Eichhorn	Generalfeldmarschall	8th (1st Brandenburg) Life Grenadiers "King Frederick William III", 18th Infantry Brigade, 9th Division, XVIII Corps, 10th Army,Heeresgruppe Eichhorn-Wilna, Heeresgruppe Eichhorn-Kiev	July 30, 1918	Kiev, Ukrainian State	Died of wounds	

== See also ==
- List of French generals who died during the First World War
- List of generals of the British Empire who died during the First World War
- List of Italian generals who died during the First World War
