= 61st Infantry Division (France) =

The 61st Infantry Division (French: 61e Division d'Infanterie, 61e DI) was a French Army formation during World War I and World War II

== World War I ==
During World War I, the division was composed of:

- 219th Infantry Regiment
- 262nd Infantry Regiment (to March 1917)
- 264th Infantry Regiment
- 265th Infantry Regiment
- 316th Infantry Regiment (to June 1916)
- 318th Infantry Regiment (to June 1916)
- 112th Territorial Infantry Regiment (from August 1918)

It was part of the French 3rd, 4th, 6th, 7th, 11th, 13th, 21st, 35th and 1st Colonial Corps, during which it participated in the First Battle of the Marne, the First Battle of the Aisne, the Battle of the Somme, the Battle of the Lys and the Meuse-Argonne Offensive.

At various times, it was part of the French First Army, French Second Army, French Third Army, French Fourth Army, French Sixth Army, French Eighth Army and French Tenth Army.

== World War II ==
During the Battle of France in May 1940, the division contained the following units:

- 248 Infantry Regiment
- 265 Infantry Regiment
- 337 Infantry Regiment
- 58 Reconnaissance Battalion
- 18 Artillery Regiment
- 218 Artillery Regiment

It was a Series B Reserve division containing older reservists.
