= Charles Jacquot =

French World War I general

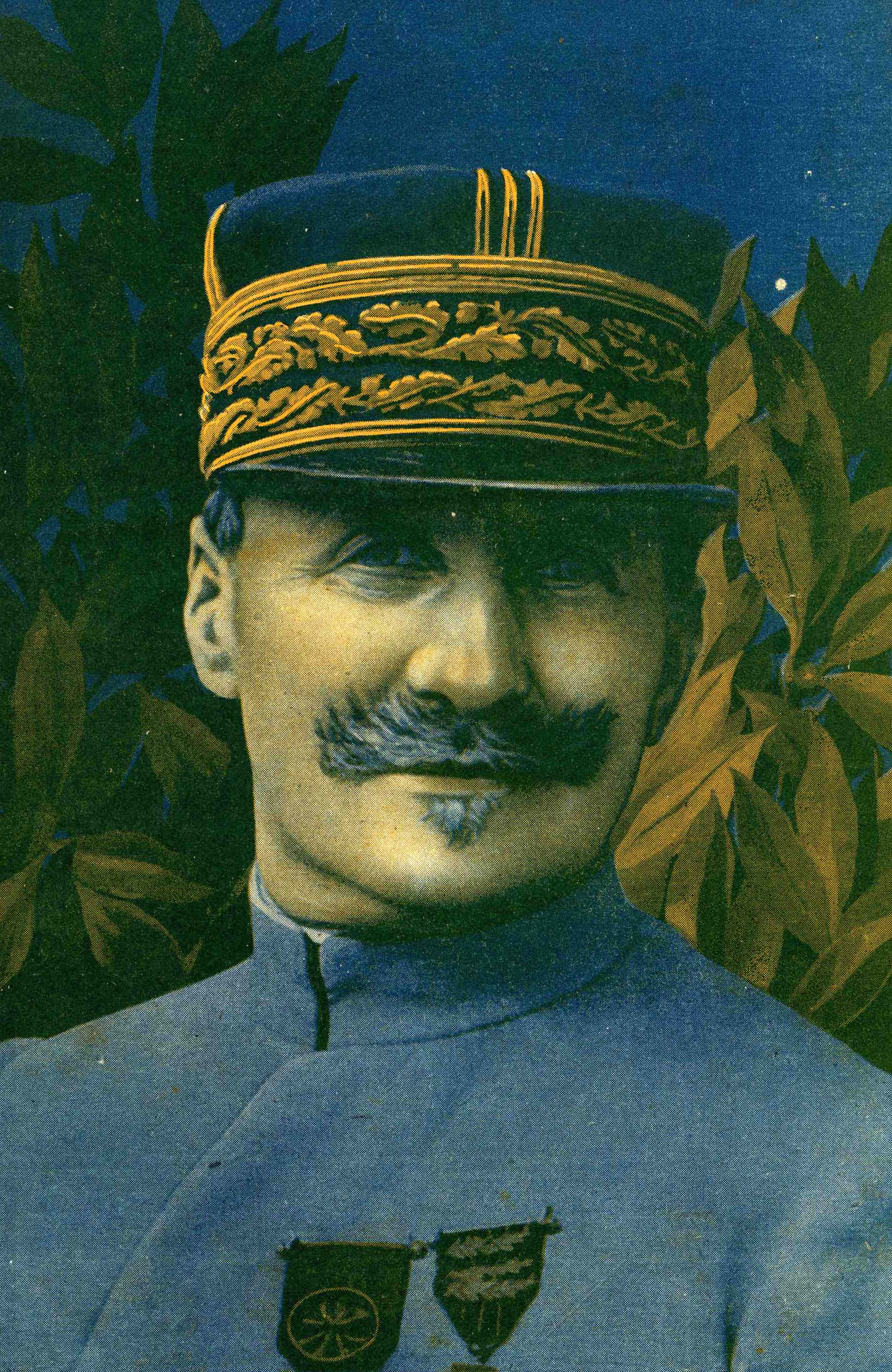
- Born: 28 September 1862; La Bourgonce, Vosges, France
- Died: 22 June 1922 (aged 59); Bonn, Rhine, Prussia, Germany
- Education: École spéciale militaire de Saint-Cyr
- Military career
- Allegiance: France
- Branch: French Army
- Service years: 1882 – 1922
- Rank: Divisional General
- Conflicts: World War I: Western Front; Battle of Verdun; Battle of the Somme; Battle of Vimy Ridge; Second Battle of the Aisne

Commander of the 33rd Army Corps
- In office 3 December 1921 – 28 June 1922
- President: Alexandre Millerand
- Minister of War: Louis Barthou; André Maginot
- Chief of Staff: Edmond Buat
- Preceded by: Gaston d'Armau de Pouydraguin
- Succeeded by: Paul Prosper Henrys

Commander of the 21st Army Corps
- In office 11 February 1919 – 28 June 1922
- President: Raymond Poincaré; Paul Deschanel; Alexandre Millerand
- Minister of War: Georges Clemenceau; André Lefèvre; Flaminius Raiberti; Louis Barthou; André Maginot
- Chief of Staff: Henri Alby; Edmond Buat
- Preceded by: Stanislas Naulin
- Succeeded by: Jean Adolphe Louis Robert Flavigny

Commander of the 35th Army Corps
- In office 30 April 1916 – 11 November 1918
- President: Raymond Poincaré
- Minister of War: Pierre Roques; Hubert Lyautey; Lucien Lacaze (as interim); Paul Painlevé; Georges Clemenceau
- Chief of Staff: Joseph Joffre; Robert Nivelle; Philippe Pétain; Ferdinand Foch
- Preceded by: Charles Ebener
- Succeeded by: Military unit dissolved

Commander of the 6th Infantry Division
- In office 6 November 1914 – 30 April 1916
- President: Raymond Poincaré
- Minister of War: Alexandre Millerand; Joseph Gallieni; Pierre Roques
- Chief of Staff: Joseph Joffre
- Preceded by: Philippe Pétain
- Succeeded by: Ferdinand Auguste Pont

Charles Victor Jacquot (English: /ʒæˈkoʊ/ zha-KOH, French: [ʃaʁl ʒako]; 1862–1922) was a French general during World War I. He commanded the 6th Infantry Division throughout the war as well as participating across key battles of the Western Front.

== Biography ==
Charles Jacquot was born in La Bourgonce, Vosges, on 22 September 1862.

In 1882 he entered the École spéciale militaire de Saint-Cyr. In 1884, he was second lieutenant in the 2nd Chasseurs à Pied Battalion. In 1893 he was made captain in the 38th Infantry Regiment. In 1910, then a lieutenant-colonel, he was given command of the Prytanée national militaire.

At the time of the entry into World War I he was colonel of the 107th Infantry Regiment and distinguished himself on several occasions such as on 22 August 1914, at Harifontaine, Belgium and 28 August when he broke off a German attack. Charles Jacquot's effectiveness was further noted during the First Battle of the Marne. On 27 October 1914, he was then promoted to brigadier general on the battlefield and the 6 November 1914, he was placed at the head of the 6th Infantry Division which he led during the Second Battle of Artois and with which he took Vimy Ridge on 27 September 1915. On 25 September 1915, in an observation post, he had been injured in the right shoulder by the same bullet that had just struck his chief of staff, but nevertheless refused to leave his post, which earned him a second summons to the army order in November 1915.

In April 1916, he commanded an army corps and on 22 June the same year, he was promoted to divisionary general. He then commanded the 35th Army Corps and took part in the Battle of the Somme from July to September. In 1917, he occupied the Chemin des Dames. On 9 June 1918, his units halt the German Courcelles-Ayancourt offensive. On 19 July 1918, he was given the Commander of the Legion of Honor. General Jacquot resumed service at the Chemin des Dames and entered Rocroi on 11 November 1918.

He was given command of the 21st Army Corps at Épinal, then, in January 1922, the 33rd Army Corps participated in the Occupation of the Rhineland. Jacquot died on 22 June 1922, at Bonn as a result of gas poisoning suffered in Verdun in 1916.

== Awards ==
- Commander of the Legion of Honor (19 July 2022)
- Croix de guerre 1914–1918
- 1914–1918 Inter-Allied Victory medal
- 1914–1918 Commemorative war medal
