= Henri Vanwaetermeulen =

French general

Henri Alexis Joseph Vanwaetermeulen
- Born: 14 July 1862; Merris, Bailleul, Nord, France
- Died: 16 July 1918 (aged 56); La Veuve, Marne, France
- Spouse: Madeleine Charlotte Jean Joseph Traisnel
- Military career
- Allegiance: France
- Branch: French Army
- Service years: 1883–1918
- Rank: Général de brigade
- Conflicts: Amman (1889–1892); Tonkin (1893–1896); Madagascar (1898–1900); Senegal; Mauritania; First World War (1914–1918)

Henri Alexis Joseph Vanwaetermeulen (14 July 1862 – 16 July 1918) was a French general of the First World War who began his career as a private soldier. Enlisting into a line regiment in 1883 Vanwaetermeulen was promoted to sergeant major within two years and received his commission within five. He transferred to the Troupes de marine and saw service in several French colonies. In Tonkin Vanwaetermeulen was mentioned in dispatches for leading assaults on two forts and received the Colonial Medal. He saw further service in Madagascar, Senegal and Mauritania, much of it under the command of Joseph Gallieni, and by the outbreak of the First World War was a lieutenant-colonel.

Soon after the start of the war Vanwaetermeulen was promoted to colonel and received command of a colonial regiment. He saw action in all the major French operations of 1914–16, was mentioned in dispatches at the Second Battle of Champagne and the Battle of the Somme and received the Croix de Guerre. Promoted to général de brigade by 1917 he was mortally wounded during French counter-attacks following the German spring offensive. He was posthumously appointed a commander of the Legion of Honour.

== Non-commissioned career ==
Vanwaetermeulen was born at 10:00 on 14 July 1862 at Merris, Bailleul, Nord. His father was Achille Francois Joseph Vanwaetermeulen and his mother was Zoe Lydie Loridan. He enlisted as a private soldier in the 77th Line Infantry Regiment on 6 December 1883. He received promotion to corporal on 6 June 1884 and subsequently to quartermaster corporal on 12 August and Furir sergeant on 25 December of the same year. On 19 March 1885 he reverted to the rank of sergeant before being reappointed on 1 July and promoted to sergeant major on 20 September.

== Commissioning and colonial service ==
Vanwaetermeulen became an officer candidate on 27 April 1887 and was commissioned as a sous lieutenant (second lieutenant) in the 2nd Marine Infantry Regiment on 12 March 1888. He transferred to the 1st Marine Infantry Regiment of Amman on 29 June 1889, arriving in Amman, in Jordan, on 15 September, and transferred to the 10th Marine Infantry Regiment on 1 July 1890. He was promoted to lieutenant on 15 April 1891 and transferred to the 6th Marine Infantry Regiment on 10 August. He left Amman on 29 January 1892 and became a first lieutenant on 12 April 1893. Vanwaetermeulen transferred to the 9th Marine Infantry Regiment on 14 April 1893 and was posted to Tonkin, in Vietnam, from 15 May. He received a mention in dispatches at army level for his conduct in Yên Thế Insurrection on 18 May and 1 June 1894, during which he led attacks on two forts. During the second attack he led a four-man reconnaissance party to within a few feet of the fort's walls before taking command of the storming of the fort after his captain fell wounded.

Vanwaetermeulen transferred to the 5th Marine Infantry Regiment on 28 March 1896 and left Tonkin for France on 8 August. His service was recognised by the awarding of the Colonial Medal with Tonkin clasp. He married Madeleine Charlotte Jean Joseph Traisnel on 29 October 1896 and established a house at Merville in Nord.

Promoted to capitaine (captain) on 26 November 1897, Vanwaetermeulen was assigned to the general staff in Madagascar on 29 August 1898. On 1 December that year he was transferred to the 2nd Malagasy Tirrailleurs Regiment, before serving with the 1st Malagasy Tirrailleurs Regiment from 9 May 1900. He was appointed a chevalier of the Legion of Honour on 17 July that year. He was posted back to the 5th Marine Infantry Regiment on 5 September 1900 and returned to France on 24 November.

Vanwaetermeulen received further postings to the French colonies, with his duties taking him to Senegal and Mauritania, and was promoted to lieutenant-colonel on 24 June 1912. He notably spent much of his career under the command of Colonel Joseph Gallieni, who was later to posthumously become a Marshal of France.

== First World War ==
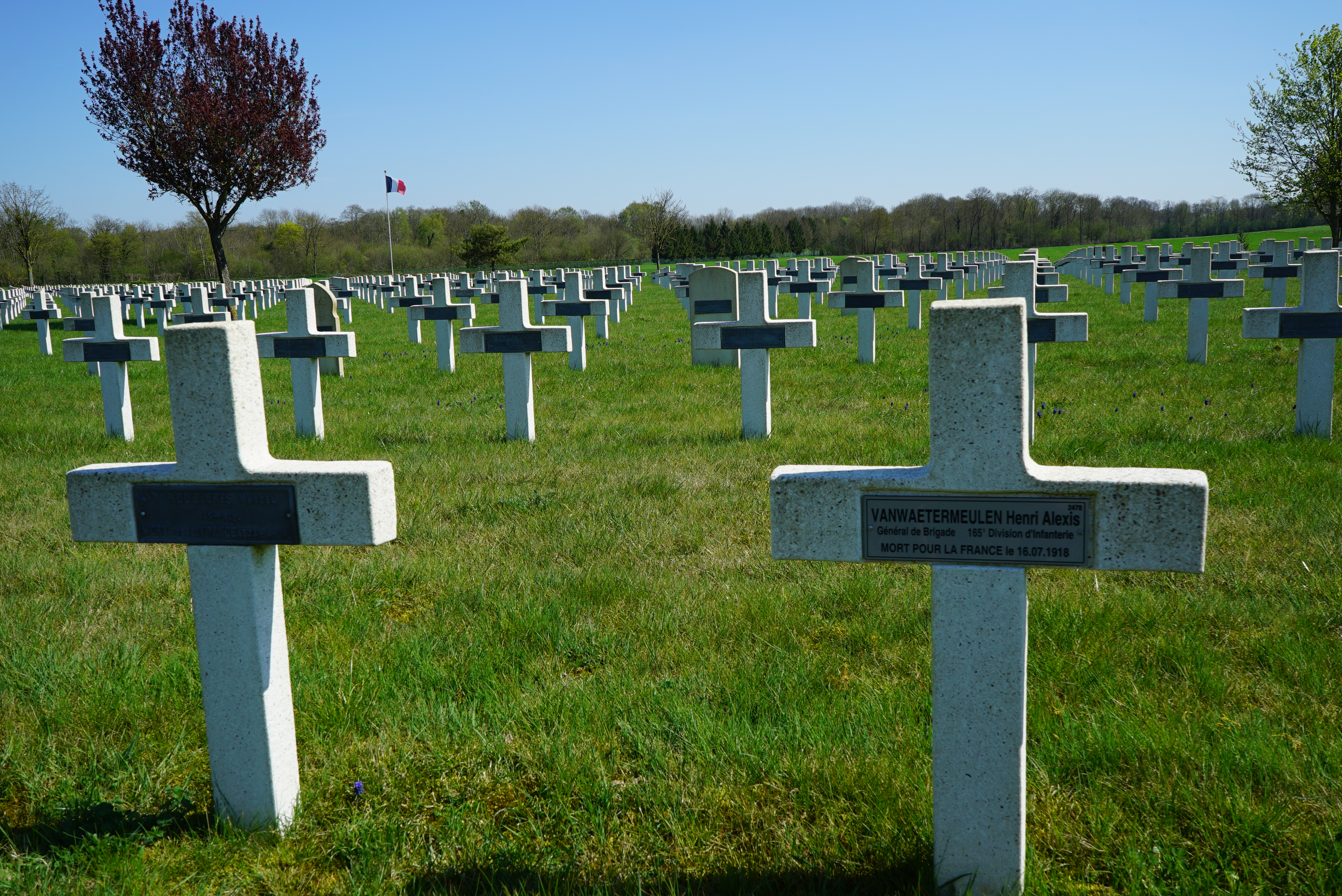
Vanwaetermeulen's grave (right) in the Nécropole nationale de Sept-Saulx

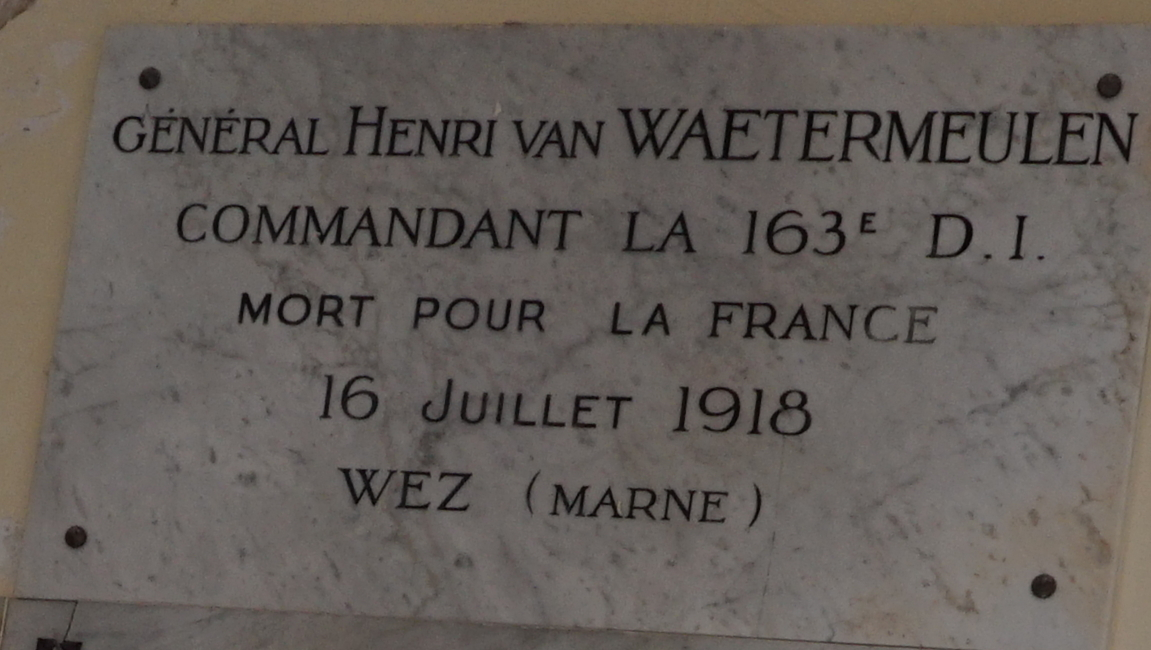
Memorial in Aux Morts des Armées de Champagne

Vanwaetermeulen was promoted to colonel in 1914 for good conduct under fire and given command of the 24th Colonial Infantry Regiment. He took part in all the major French operations in the first two years of the war, including the offensive at Neufchâteau, the Battle of the Ardennes, the action at Rossignol Wood and the First Battle of the Marne. During the latter action he was mentioned in dispatches at army level, a feat he repeated during the Second Battle of Champagne in September 1915.

Vanwaetermeulen was awarded the Croix de Guerre with palm on 22 October 1915 and appointed an officer of the Legion of Honour on 11 November, at which point he was colonel of the 21st Colonial Infantry Regiment. During this period he commanded a training camp near to Fréjus, south-east France. He was given command of the 5th Colonial Infantry Brigade on 2 July 1916 and fought at the Battle of the Somme where he was wounded on 15 July and received a further mention in dispatches for his refusal to be evacuated. He retained command of his brigade until March 1917 when he was given command of the infantry of the 165th Metropolitan Division, then held in reserve at Villers-Bretonneux.

Vanwaetermeulen was promoted to général de brigade (brigadier-general) on 20 December 1917 during the second offensive at Verdun. He commanded his troops in the defence against the German spring offensive at the Battle of Matz and the counterattacks at Belloy and Lataule. He was wounded by shrapnel on 10 July 1918 and died of his wounds in an ambulance at La Veuve, Marne on 16 July. He was posthumously appointed a commander of the Legion of Honour 8 October 1918.
