= La Bourgonce =

- Commune
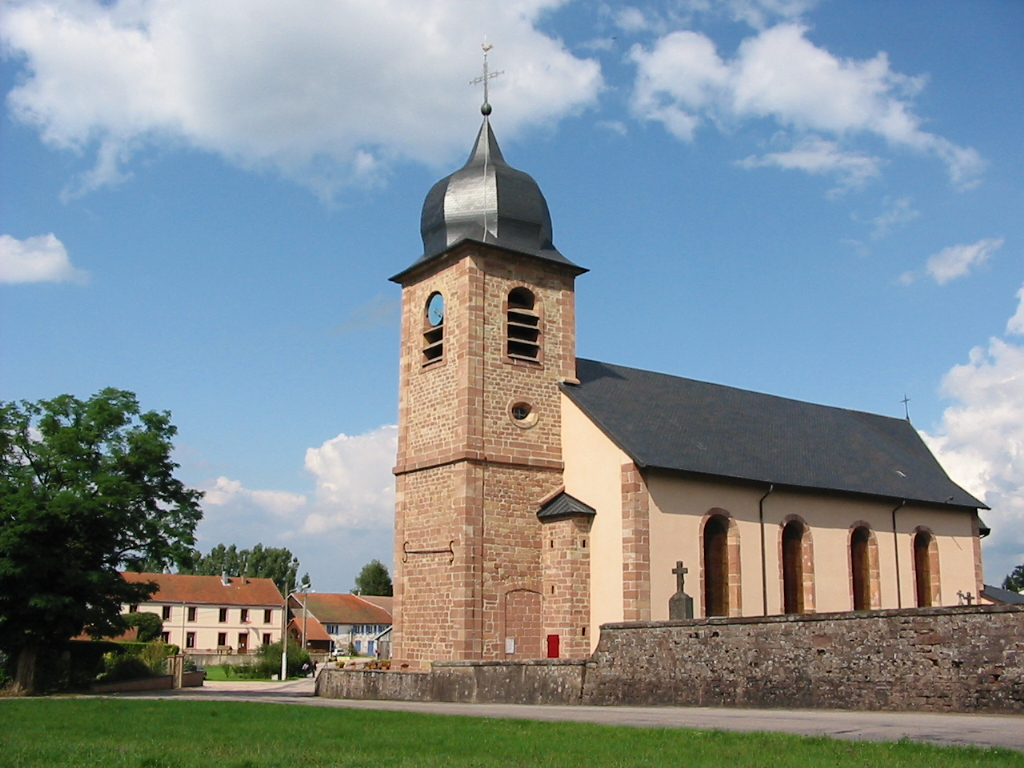
- Town hall and the church of Saint-Denis

- Coat of arms
- Location of La Bourgonce
- Location within France Location within Grand Est
- Coordinates: 48°18′43″N 6°49′41″E
- Country: France
- Region: Grand Est
- Department: Vosges
- Arrondissement: Saint-Dié-des-Vosges
- Canton: Saint-Dié-des-Vosges-1
- Intercommunality: CA Saint-Dié-des-Vosges

Government
  - Mayor (2020–2026): Denis Huin
- Area^{1}: 16.56 km^{2} (6.39 sq mi)
- Elevation: 356 m (1,168 ft)
- Highest elevation: 625 m (2,051 ft)
- Lowest elevation: 353 m (1,158 ft)
- Population (2023): 842
  - Density: 50.8/km^{2} (132/sq mi)
- Time zone: UTC+01:00 (CET)
  - Summer (DST): UTC+02:00 (CEST)
- INSEE/Postal code: 88068 /88470
- ^{1} French Land Register data, which excludes lakes, ponds, glaciers > 1 km^{2} (0.386 sq mi or 247 acres) and river estuaries.

La Bourgonce (French pronunciation: [la buʁɡɔ̃s]) is a commune in the Vosges department in Grand Est in northeastern France.

== See also ==
- Communes of the Vosges department
