= Gabriel Malleterre =

Brigadier General Gabriel Malleterre
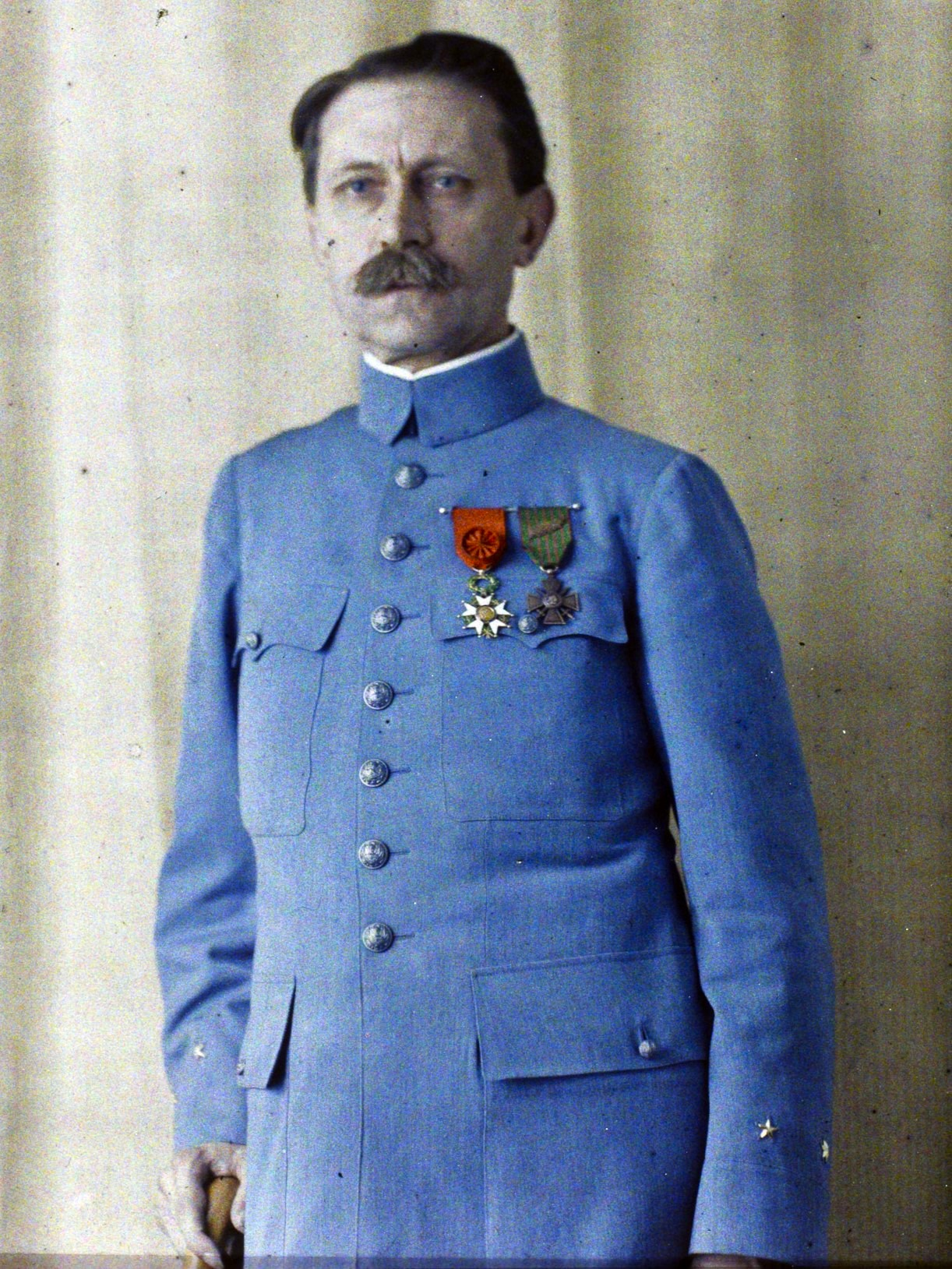
- Autochrome portrait by Auguste Léon, 1918
- Born: 30 April 1858 Bergerac, Dordogne, France
- Died: 26 November 1923 (aged 65) Paris, France
- Allegiance: France
- Branch: French Army
- Rank: Brigadier General
- Awards: Commander of the Legion of Honour; Croix de Guerre 1914-1918

Pierre Marie Gabriel Malleterre (30 April 1858 – 26 November 1923) was a French general of the First World War.

== Biography ==
Born in Bergerac in Dordogne, he was admitted into the École Spéciale Militaire de Saint-Cyr in 1878, studying for the infantry. He campaigned in Algeria and Tunisia from 1880 to 1885, then returned to Saint-Cyr, teaching until 1899. He served as colonel in the 46th Infantry Regiment from 1910 to 1914, but was wounded on September at Vassincourt during the First Battle of the Marne, which required the amputation of his right leg.

Promoted to brigadier general in 1915, he was named to the prestigious posts of director of the Musée de l'Armée and governor of the Hôtel des Invalides, serving in both posts until his death in 1923. He was entombed in les Invalides with its other former commandants. While at the hospital, his wife Charlotte Malleterre (sister of his friend Gustave Léon Niox, who previously served as governor) provided the initial impetus for what is now known as the Bleuet de France.

Malleterre was also author of a number of works on geography and military history, primarily concerned with the First World War.

== Sources ==
- Dossier on the Légion d'honneur of général Malleterre.
