= Antonino Cascino =

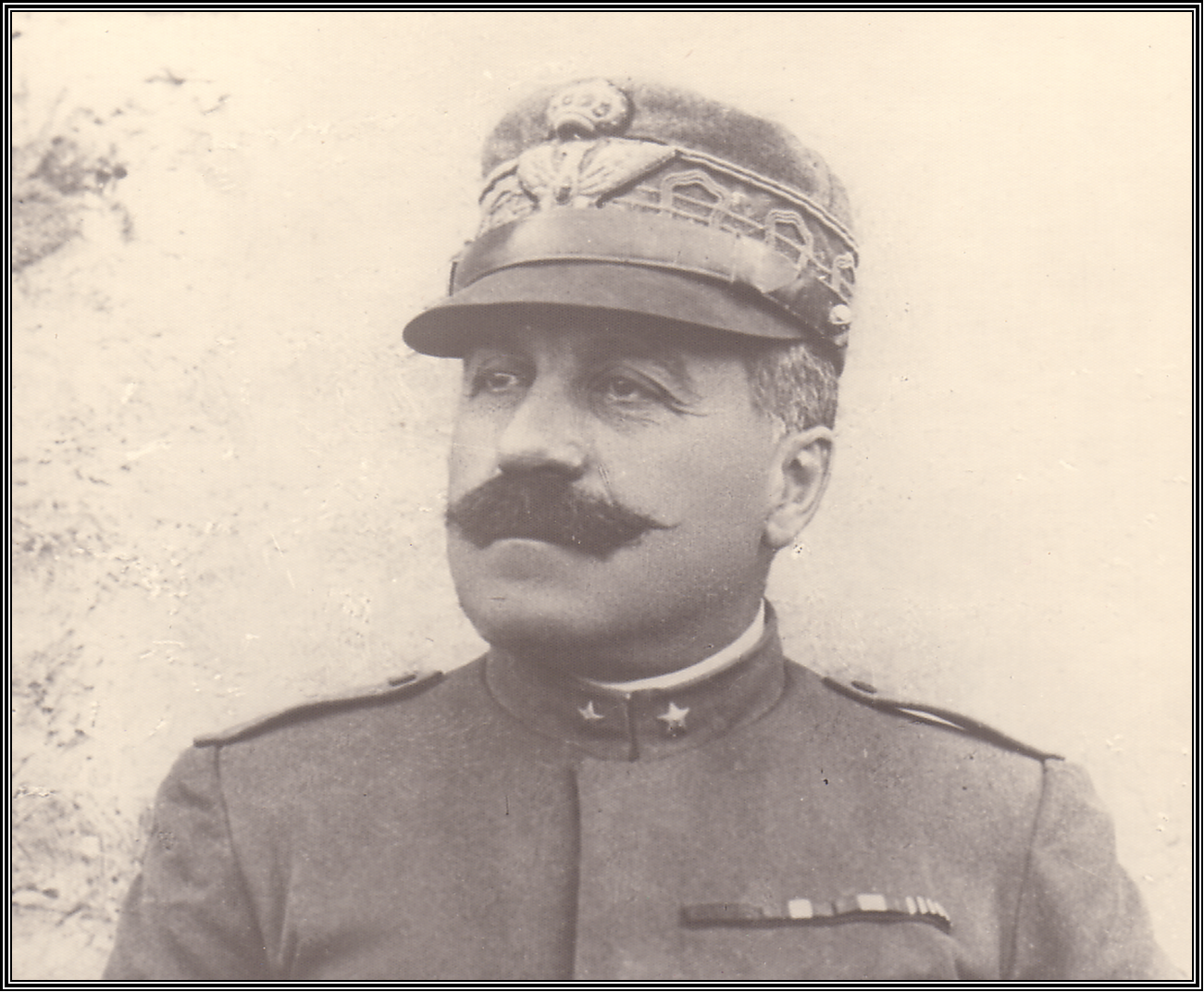
- General Cascino in the 1910s
- Born: September 14, 1862; Piazza Armerina, Kingdom of Italy
- Died: September 29, 1917 (aged 55) Quisca, Slovenia
- Allegiance: Kingdom of Italy
- Branch: Army
- Service years: 1879-1917
- Rank: Major General
- Commands: 8th Division, 231st Infantry Regiment "Avellino"
- Conflicts: World War I; Battle of Vodice; Eleventh Battle of the Isonzo
- Awards: Silver Medal of Military Valor, Gold Medal of Military Valor

Antonino Cascino (September 14, 1862 - September 29, 1917) was an Italian major general who was killed during World War I. He is quoted as saying "Be the avalanche that rises!" in the midst of battle.

== Biography ==
Little is known about Cascino's early Life, he was born in 1862 and began his military career in 1879 when he was 17 or 18 years old. By 1914, he was an esteemed general in the Italian Army. In 1916, he was the first Italian general to enter Gorizia with the "Avellino" Brigade 231st - 232nd Infantry Regiment, consisting mostly of Sicilians. Immediately afterwards, the brigade was employed on the front line against the Austrians on Monte San Marco, Plava and Vodice , where under the leadership of Cascino it demonstrated courage and tenacity.

After the Battle of Vodice, for which he was awarded the Silver Medal of Military Valor, Cascino was promoted to lieutenant general, commanding the 8th Division, made up of the "Avellino" and "Forlì" brigades. His next objective was the conquest of Monte Santo, of significant strategic importance in the ongoing conflict. This operation was successful after a series of assaults that caused very heavy losses.

Admiring General Cascino's valor, Arturo Toscanini reached Monte Santo and directed a military band, which played patriotic hymns and songs in the face of the Austrians from 25 to 29 August 1917. During the subsequent attempt to conquer Škabrijel, on 15 September 1917, Cascino was seriously wounded in the thigh by a shrapnel from an Austrian shell. He refused immediate hospitalization, preferring to ensure the position, exposed to repeated attacks by Austro-Hungarian infantry and artillery, was held with his presence. His subsequent hospitalization came too late. After 12 days of agony, General Cascino died in the Quisca hospital. He is remembered for his phrase, "Be the avalanche that rises!", addressed to his soldiers who were preparing for the enterprise that he himself wanted to lead, and which is reproduced on the monument erected in his honor in the center of his hometown, in the square that bears his name.
