= Bleuet de France =

France symbol of memory or solidarity with war veterans and victims

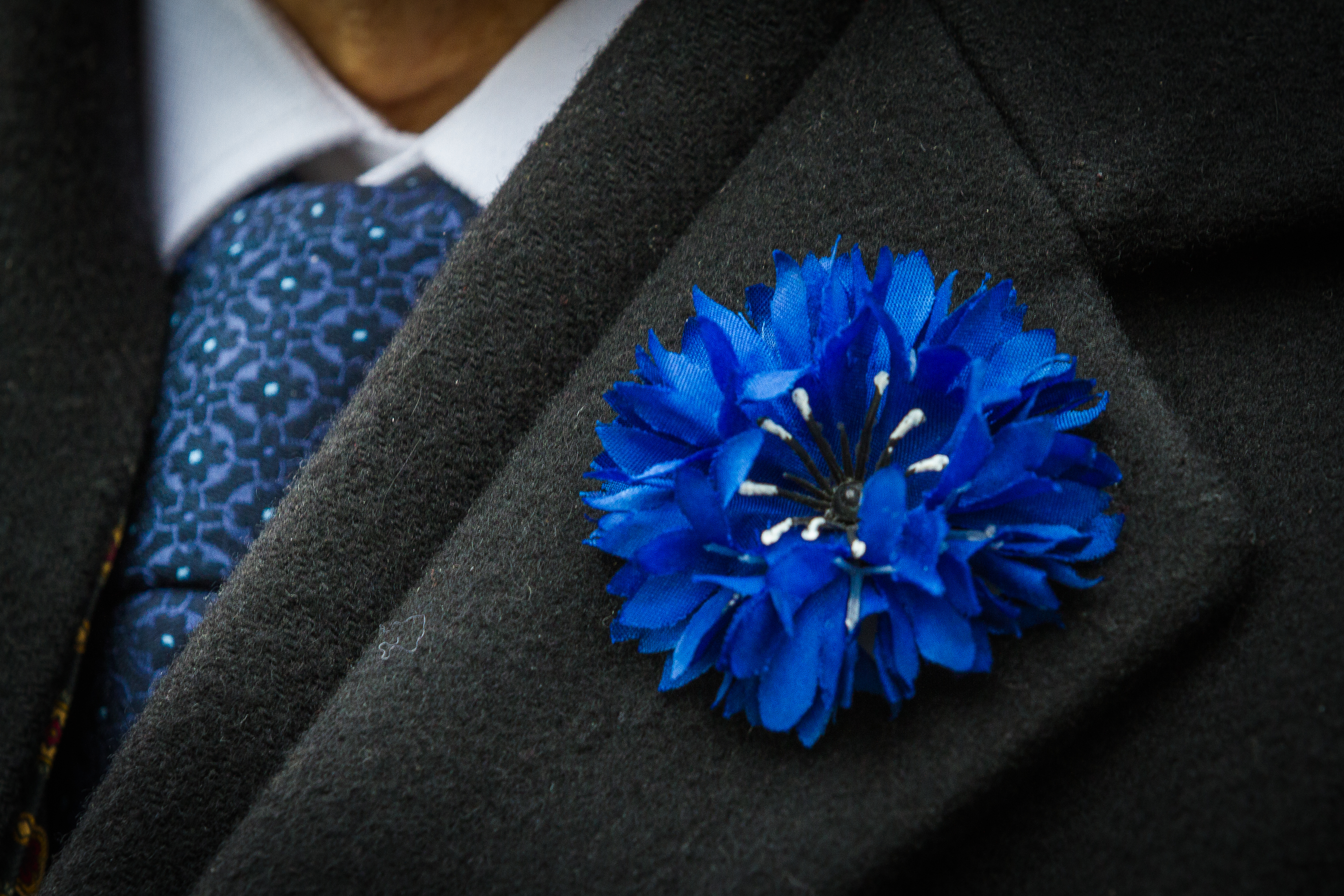
Bleuet de France, 2013 version

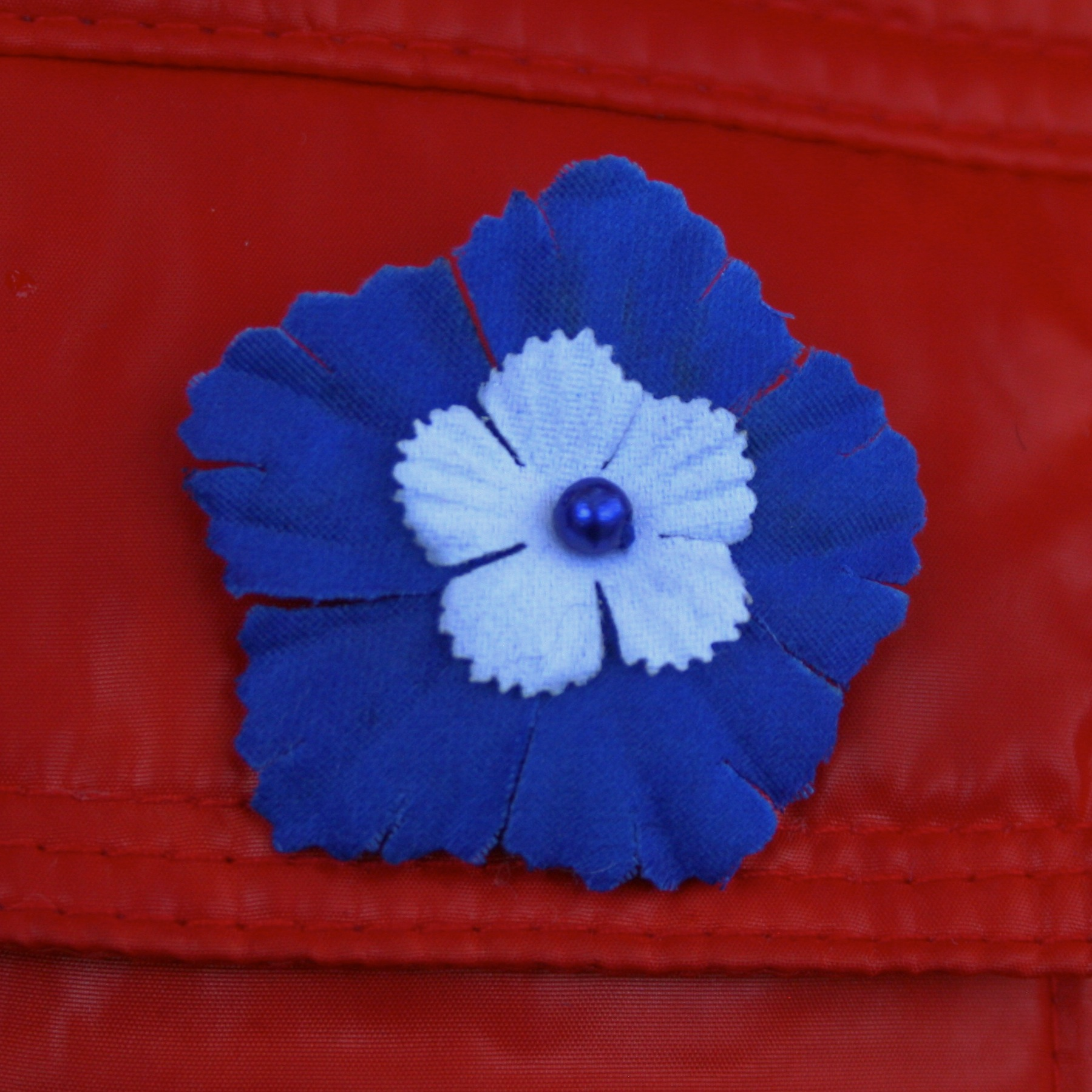
Bleuet de France, 2012 version

In France, the bleuet de France (French pronunciation: [blø.ɛ də fʁɑ̃s]), a cornflower, is the symbol of memory for and solidarity with veterans, victims of war and terrorism, widows, and orphans, similar to the Commonwealth remembrance poppy. The sale of bleuet de France badges on 11 November and 8 May is used to finance charitable works for those causes.

== Origins ==
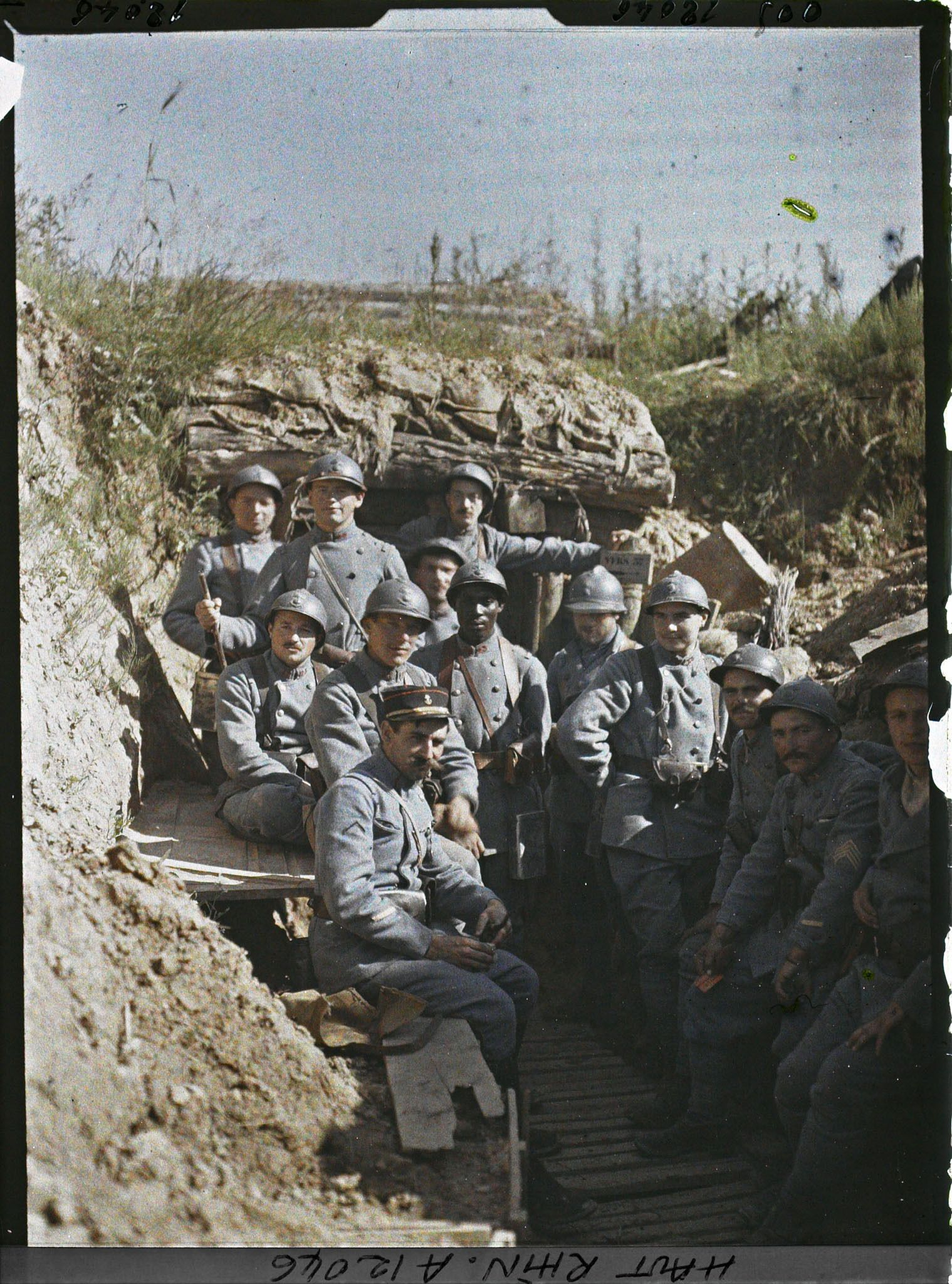
World War I French soldiers at rest, wearing their iconic blue uniforms.

The cornflower – like the poppy – continued to grow in land devastated by the thousands of shells which were launched daily by the entrenched armies of the Western Front. These flowers were often the only visible evidence of life, and the only sign of color in the mud of the trenches.

At the same time, the term bleuets was used also to refer to the class of conscripted soldiers born in 1897 who arrived in the lead-up to the Second Battle of the Aisne, because of the bleu horizon worn by French soldiers after 1915. The uniform worn by these recruits, many of whom were not even 20 years old, was distinctive because it marked a break from the pantalon rouge trousers worn by older soldiers, which were part of the standard uniform before the First World War.

As the war dragged on and the novelty of the term faded, the title endured because the uniforms that fresh arrivals wore into the trenches were still new and brightly colored, in contrast with the mud-stained uniforms of veteran troops.

The popularity of the term was such that the image became a potent symbol in postcards, posters, songs, and poems:

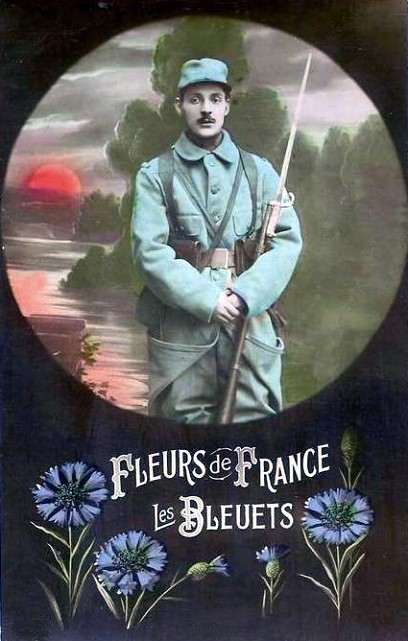
Propaganda postcard.

Les voici les p’tits « Bleuets »
Les Bleuets couleur des cieux
Ils vont jolis, gais et coquets,
Car ils n’ont pas froid aux yeux.
En avant partez joyeux ;
Partez, amis, au revoir !
Salut à vous, les petits « bleus »,
Petits « bleuets », vous notre espoir !

— Alphonse Bourgoin, from Bleuets de France, 1916.
Translation:

These here, these little "Bleuets"
These Bleuets the color of the sky,
Are beautiful, cheerful, stylish,
Because they are not afraid.
Merrily, go forward
Go on, my friends, so long!
Good luck for you, little "blues"
Little "bleuets," you are our hope!

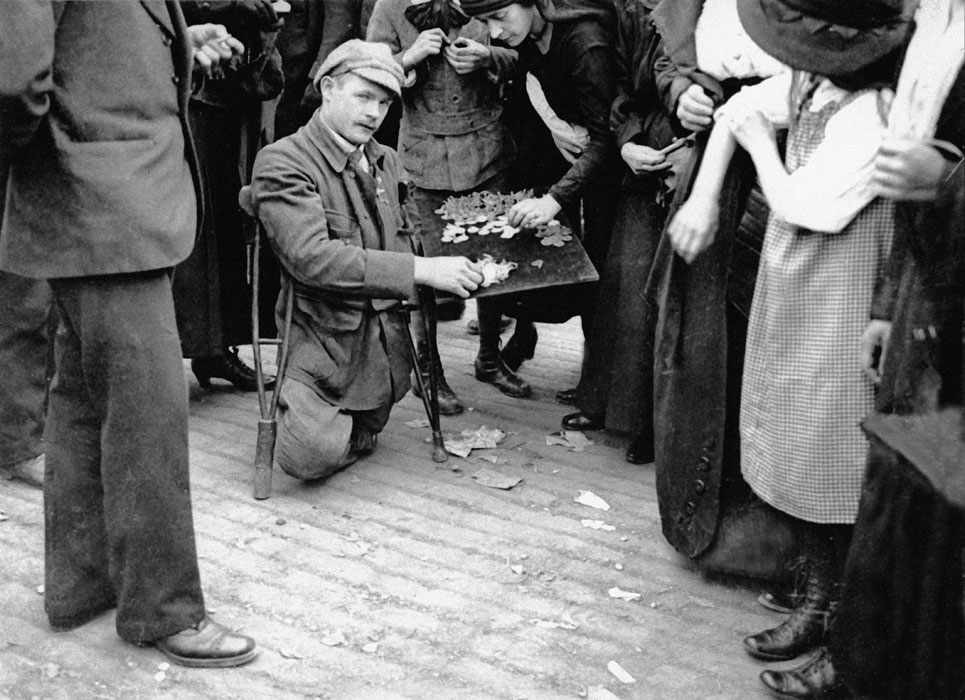
A war amputee selling bleuets on the Champs-Élysées, 4 July 1919.

The origin of the badge dates to 1916. It was created by Suzanne Lenhardt, head nurse in Les Invalides, and Charlotte Malleterre. Lenhardt was the widow of a Colonial Infantry captain killed in 1915, and Malleterre was the sister of Général Gustave Léon Niox and the wife of Général Gabriel Malleterre. They were both moved by the suffering endured by the war wounded for whom they were responsible and, needing to provide them with some activity, organized workshops where cornflower badges were made from tissue paper. These were sold to the public at various times, with the money collected providing the men a small income. They gradually became a symbol of the rehabilitation of soldiers through labor.

On 15 September 1920, Louis Fontenaille, the president of Mutilés de France, proposed making the bleuet the eternal symbol of those who died for France. This had the support of the FIDAC (Federation Interalliee des Anciens Combattants).

In 1928, after French President Gaston Doumergue gave his patronage to the bleuet, sales gradually spread countrywide. By 11 November 1934, 128,000 flowers were sold. From 1935, the French government officialized the sale of bleuets on Remembrance Day.

In 1957, a second commemorative day was denoted for 8 May, VE Day, the anniversary of the surrender of Nazi Germany in the Second World War.

== See also ==
- Poilu
- Trench art

== Sources ==
- Lindecker, Jacques (1999). Les Bleuets de l'Espoir. Éditions Nathan. ISBN 2092824805.
- Rouaud, Jean (1990). Les Champs d'honneur. Éditions de Minuit. ISBN 2707313475.
- Japrisot, Sébastien (1991). Un long dimanche de fiançailles. Denoël. ISBN 2207236102.
