= 35th Army Corps (France) =

35th Army Corps 35^{e} Corps d'Armée
- Active: 15 décembre 1914
- Country: France
- Allegiance: France
- Branch: French Army
- Type: Army Corps
- Engagements: First World War: 1916 - Battle of the Somme; 1918 - Third Battle of the Aisne; 1918 - Battle of Amiens (1918)

The 35th Army Corps was an army corps of the French Army.

It was created on 27/08/1914 as the 6th Group of Infantry Divisions of the Réserve. On 15 December 1914 it was redesignated the 35th Army Corps. Amongst others it fought in the Battle of the Somme.

Its commanders included:

- 12/12/1914: General Charles Ebener
- 29/04/1916: Général Charles Jacquot

== Composition ==
- 37th Infantry Division from January 1915 to January 1916
- 53rd Infantry Division from January 1916 to November 1918
- 61st Infantry Division from January 1915 to July 1917
- 121st Infantry Division from January 1916 to November 1918

=== Infantry regiments ===
- 68th Territorial Infantry Regiment from June 1915 to novembre 1918
- 69th Territorial Infantry Régiment from June 1915 to June 1918 (dissolution)
- 1st Bataillon de Chasseurs à Pied Territoriaux from June 1915 to May 1916
- 4th Bataillon de Chasseurs à Pied Territoriaux from June 1915 to May 1916
