= John Cornelius O'Callaghan =

Irish historian and writer

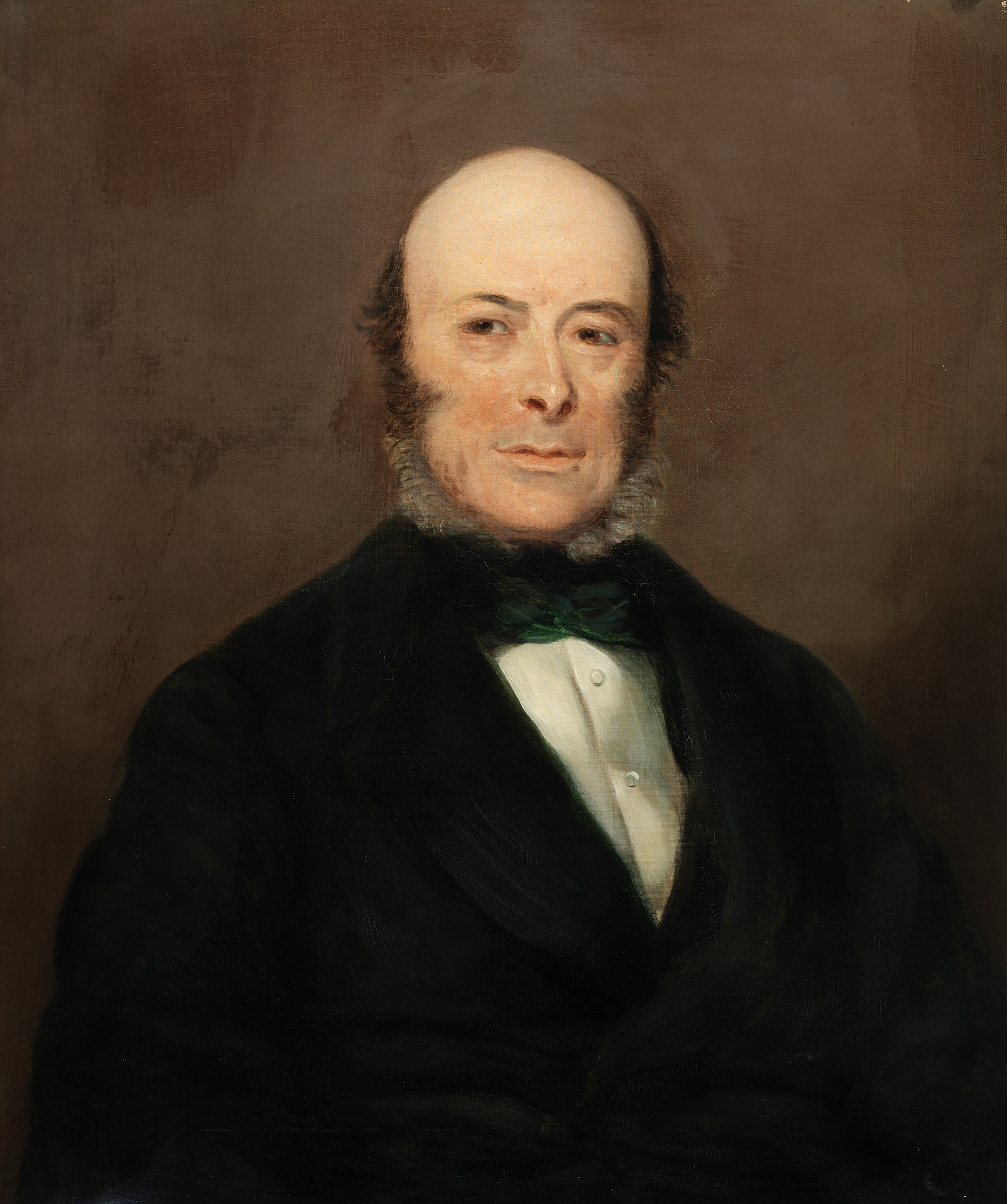
- Born: Dublin
- Died: 24 April 1883
- Writing career
- Notable work: History of the Irish Brigades in the Service of France

John Cornelius O'Callaghan (1805 – 24 April 1883) was an Irish historian and writer. He is best remembered for his work History of the Irish Brigades in the Service of France.

== Life ==
O'Callaghan was born in Dublin. His father was a solicitor from Talbot St. in the city; his mother (née Donovan) came from the south of the country. He was educated at Clongowes Wood and later at a school in Blanchardstown.

He first started writing in the Comet and in the Irish Monthly Magazine of Politics and Literature. The latter's contributors included Daniel O'Connell, his daughter Mrs. Fitzsimons, Richard Lalor Sheil and one of O'Callaghan's closest literary friends, Richard Robert Madden. He was in London in 1840 when the first edition of his book The Green Book was published, and back in Dublin shortly afterwards to contribute to the newly established The Nation.

In 1847, at the request of the Irish Archaeological Society, he published Macariae Excidium; The Destruction of Cyprus, or, a Secret History of the War of Revolution in Ireland. He spent the following years preparing his greatest work, the History of the Irish brigades in the service of France,: From the revolution in Great Britain and Ireland under James II., to the revolution in France under Louis XVI., which was first published in 1867.

== See also ==
- Irish Brigade (France)
