= Paul Lancrenon =

French soldier and photographer (1857–1922)

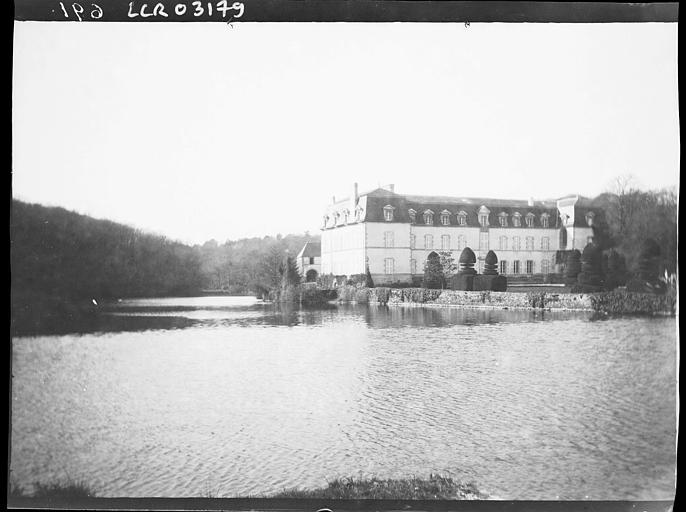
The Abbaye Saint-Maurice de Carnoët photographed in 1893 by Paul Lancrenon

Marie-Paul Mathieu Lancrenon (26 July 1857 in Besançon – 10 July 1922 in Paris) was a French soldier and amateur photographer.

== Biography ==
=== Studies and military career ===
Born into a prominent Besançon family − his father was a notaire − he studied at the École Polytechnique, leaving in 1876. He then joined the École d'application de l'artillerie et du génie at Fontainebleau.

In 1881, he was attached to the expeditionary force which took part in the march on Tunis which led to the installation of the French protectorate.

In 1890, he became a staff officer. As colonel, he commanded the 2nd Artillery Regiment in 1914. In December 1914, he was named brigadier general and took part in the Battle of the Somme and the Battle of Verdun. He was promoted to divisional general in September 1917. He finished his military career in 1918, as deputy inspector in the north African territories. He retired for health reasons, following an illness contracted during the war.

=== A prolific amateur photographer ===
In parallel with his military career, he led numerous expeditions and voyages, bringing back many photographic images. He was the author of a series of pictures on Brittany, from where his wife had originated.

In 1891, he toured Europe during a six months holiday; leaving Belfort by bicycle, his trip took him as far as Russia. In 1896, he descended the course of the Upper Rhine from the Danube and the Volga in canoe. He published a notebook of his expedition under the title Trois mille lieues à la pagaie, de la Seine à la Volga ("Three thousand leagues by paddle, from the Seine to the Volga") which led to him being proposed for the Ordre des Palmes académiques.

He was also the author of several mountain trips. He crossed the Alps to carry out reconnaissances of passes. From these expeditions, he published in 1906 Impressions d'hiver dans les Alpes. De la mer bleue au Mont-Blanc ("Impressions of winter in the Alps. From the blue sea to Mont Blanc"). He also crossed the Pyrenees in 1907 where he notably photographed Spanish migrants going to France.

He died in 1922 at the Val-de-Grâce military hospital, the result of illness contracted at the front. He was declared "mort pour la France" in 1925.

In 1987, the French government acquired his photographic archive, comprising more than 5,000 negatives. They are now preserved in the French photographic archives.

== Decorations ==
- 1894 : Médaille coloniale clasp : "TUNISIE"
- 1897 : Chevalier de la Légion d'honneur
- 1914 : Officier de la Légion d'honneur
- 1919 : Order of the White Eagle of Serbia

== Bibliography ==
- Paul Lancrenon, Trois mille lieues à la pagaie, de la Seine à la Volga, Paris, E. Plon-Nourrit et Cie, 1898
- Paul Lancrenon, Impressions d'hiver dans les Alpes. : De la mer bleue au Mont-Blanc, Paris, E. Plon-Nourrit et Cie, 1906
- Paul Lancrenon, Les Travaux de la mission télégraphique du Tchad (1910–1913), Paris, Comité de l'Afrique française, 1914
