= Jean Colin (general) =

French general (1864–1917)

Jean Colin (also Jean-Alphonse and Jean-Lambert-Alphonse; December 27, 1864 – December 30, 1917) was a French general and military writer. He has been judged "one of the brilliant members of the French General Staff before 1914."

Educated at the École polytechnique, he worked in the history service of the army from 1900 to 1906. He served in World War I, was made a général de brigade in 1917 and was killed that year in Serbia.

He translated Clausewitz's Der Feldzug von 1796 in Italien (1859) as Études sur la campagne de 1796-1797 en Italie (1889).

His best known work is Les transformations de la Guerre (Paris, 1911), translated as France and the Next War or as Transformations of War by L.H.R. Pope-Hennessy (London, 1912). His criticisms of Napoleon and the offensive school were controversial.

== Other works ==
- Les Campagnes du maréchal de Saxe (1901–1906)
- L'éducation militaire de Napoléon
- Louis XV et les Jacobites: Le projet de débarquement en Angleterre de 1743–1744. Paris: Librairie Militarie R. Chapelot et Cie., 1901.
