= Alleged military conspiracy of 1877 =

Possible coup attempt in France, during the 16 May 1877 crisis

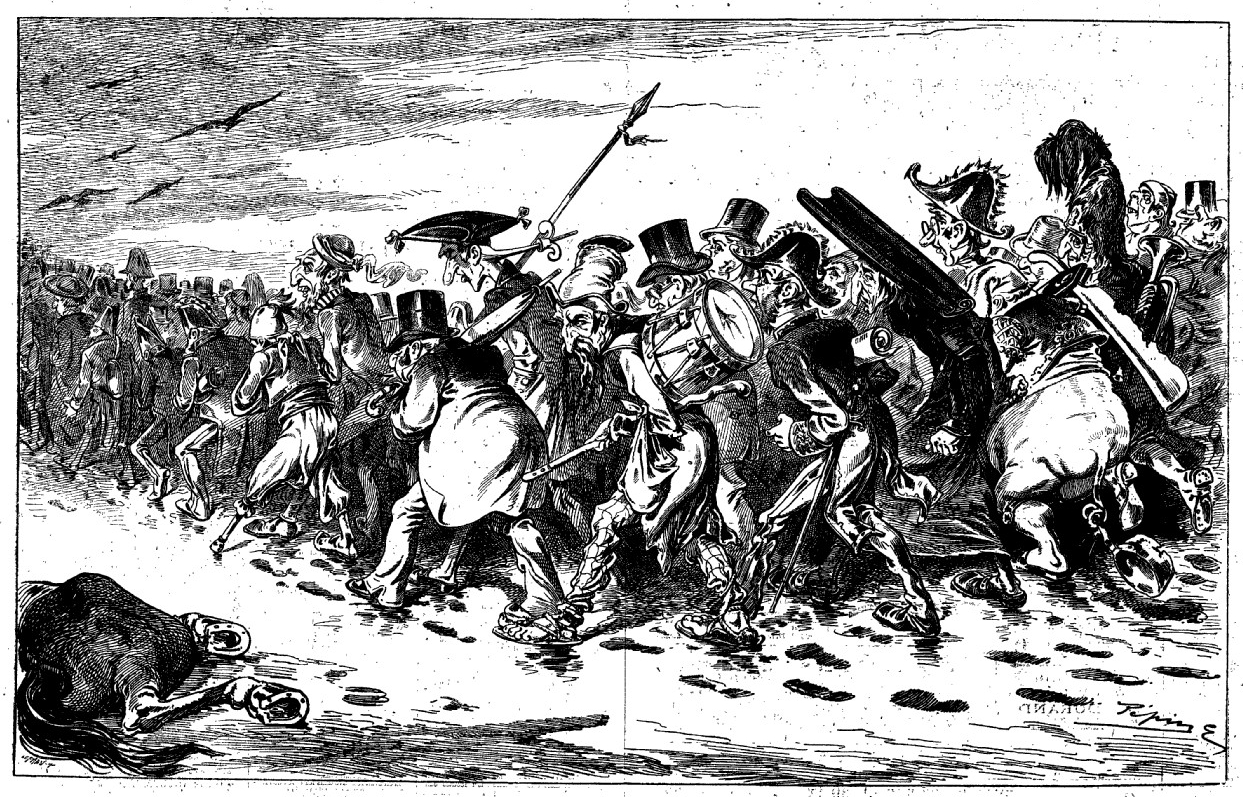
La Grande Retraite, 1877, a cartoon in Le Grelot. The political failure of the monarchists is caricatured as a military debacle reminiscent of Napoleon.

The Alleged military conspiracy of 1877, or attempted coup d'état, was a possible failed coup attempt in France during the May Sixteenth crisis. The aim of the conspirators – led by generals Auguste-Alexandre Ducrot and Gaëtan de Rochebouët – was to keep the Ordre moral government in power. Lacking the support of Marshal de Mac Mahon, who remained committed to the law, this military plot would have remained at the project stage. However, it was widely exploited by the Republicans to undermine the monarchists' credentials and stigmatize the social conservatism of the French army's leaders. In fact, between January 1878 and February 1879, the generals suspected of having taken part in the preparations for the putsch were purged, prompting Mac Mahon to resign.

== Context: May 16th ==
=== Opening the crisis ===
The events took place against a turbulent political backdrop. The legislative elections of 1876 had been won by a republican majority, while the president of the republic, Marshal de Mac Mahon, was a staunch monarchist. Faced with a restive Chamber of Deputies intent on imposing its demands and putting an end to the Ordre Moral policy, the Marshal refused to back down. Since he did not support the measures taken by Jules Simon's government to combat Ultramontanism, he dismissed it on May 16, 1877. From then on, the situation escalated: left-wing deputies met to sign Manifesto of the 363, which condemned the attitude of the president, who appointed Duke Albert de Broglie as head of government. Although the latter was not an intransigent monarchist – a liberal Catholic and Orleanist – he was unable to win the approval of the Chamber of Deputies.

With the break between Versailles and the Élysée complete, on June 22, 1877, the Marshal obtained the consent of the Senate to dissolve the Chamber in accordance with the constitutional laws of 1875. The monarchists and republicans threw all their weight into the electoral battle, with Minister Oscar Bardi de Fourtou taking firm control of the administration to ensure the victory of the conservatives. Nevertheless, the October 1877 legislative elections were won by the Republicans, although they lost several dozen seats compared to 1876.

=== Formation of the Rochebouët cabinet ===
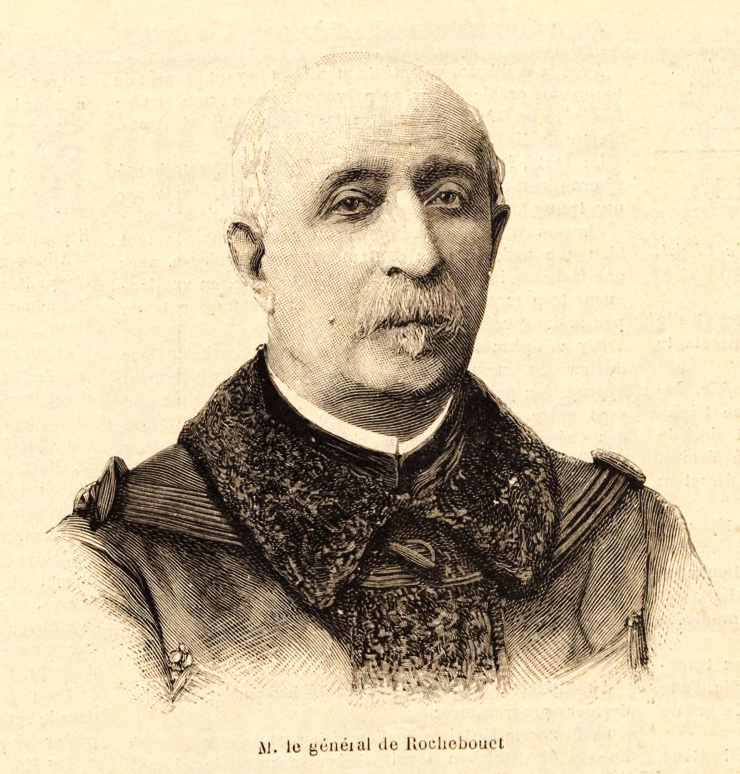
Gaëtan de Rochebouët, President of the Council and Minister of War in his short-lived government.

Faced with an impasse, Patrice de Mac Mahon decided to call on one of his close friends, General de Rochebouët, to form a new government. He had previously considered forming a "military cabinet" with General Félix Charles Douay in charge of war and General Auguste-Alexandre Ducrot in charge of the interior, but having given up on bringing the army into the political arena in this way, he ruled out this possibility. By appointing Rochebouët as President of the council, Mac Mahon reaffirmed his respect for institutions and seemed to be forming a transitional government, thus ruling out the idea of a coup d'état.

However, once Rochebouët was in office, the temptation of a coup stirred the military high command, as it had a few years before.

=== The "Saint-Arnaud of the Restoration" ===
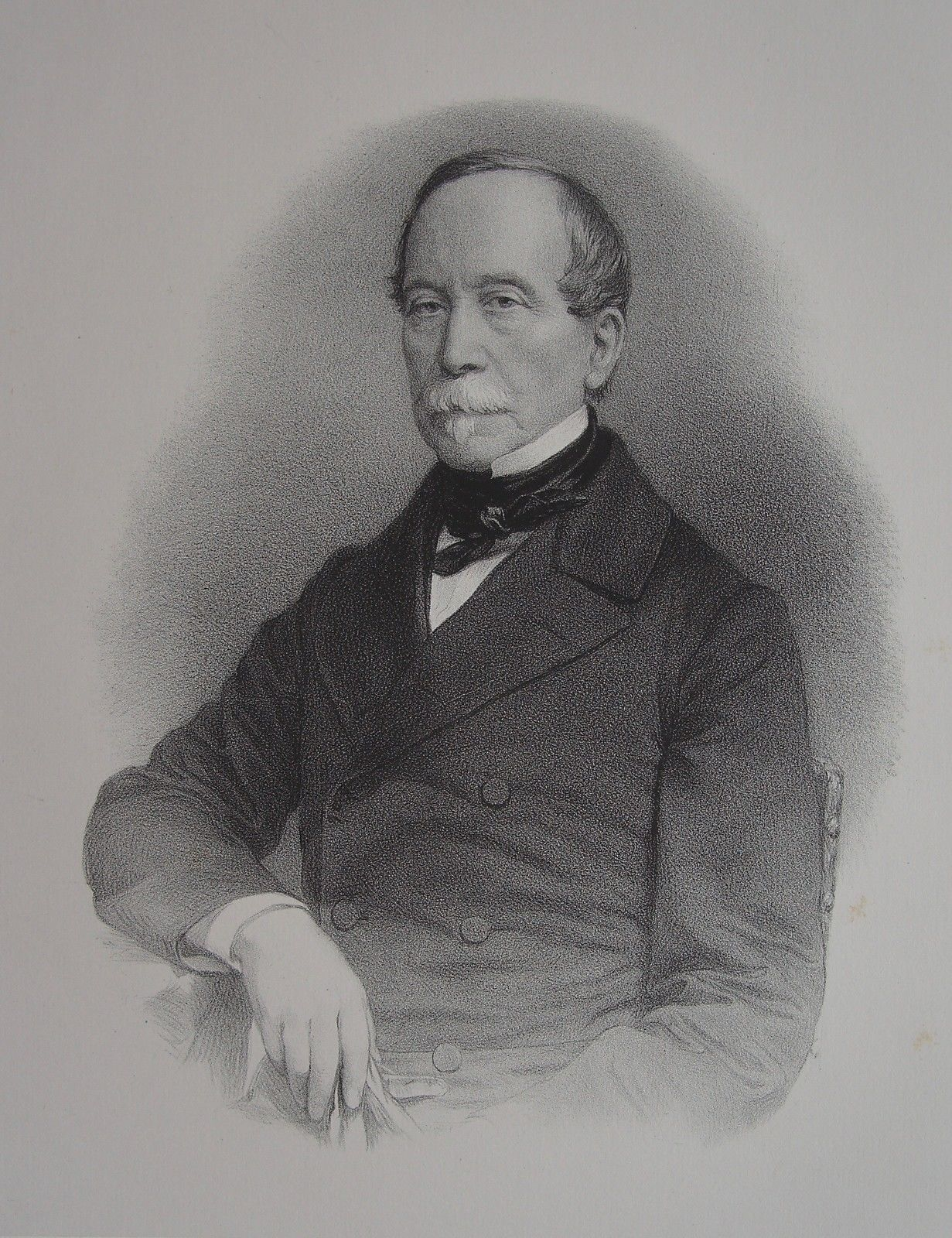
General Changarnier, an advocate of the hard way to achieve the "Third Restoration".

The temptation of a coup d'état faced by Gaétan de Rochebouët's government was not new during the Third Republic. As early as 1871, General Nicolas Changarnier offered his services to restore order and establish an authoritarian monarchical regime. According to the historian François Bédarida, Changarnier "burned to be the Saint-Arnaud of a monarchical restoration". General Changarnier was unable to carry out his plans to "clean up" Versailles, as he was repeatedly rebuffed by the very legalistic Patrice de Mac Mahon. His death in February 1877 also prevented him from participating in the possible preparations for December 1877.

However, a number of generals shared General Changarnier's concerns and disapproved of the president's political maneuvers, which they considered too pusillanimous. General du Barail, for example, wrote in his memoirs that in order to be successful in Seize Mai, he would have acted "by not looking back, by throwing away the scabbard from which the sword had been drawn, by marching straight and fast. In his view, the 363 signatories of the manifesto should have been arrested as soon as the House adjourned, since they no longer enjoyed parliamentary immunity. A strict application of censorship would then have made it possible to prepare for the elections, with newspapers "kept within the bounds of civility and polite discussion".

== Development ==
=== General Ducrot's campaigns ===
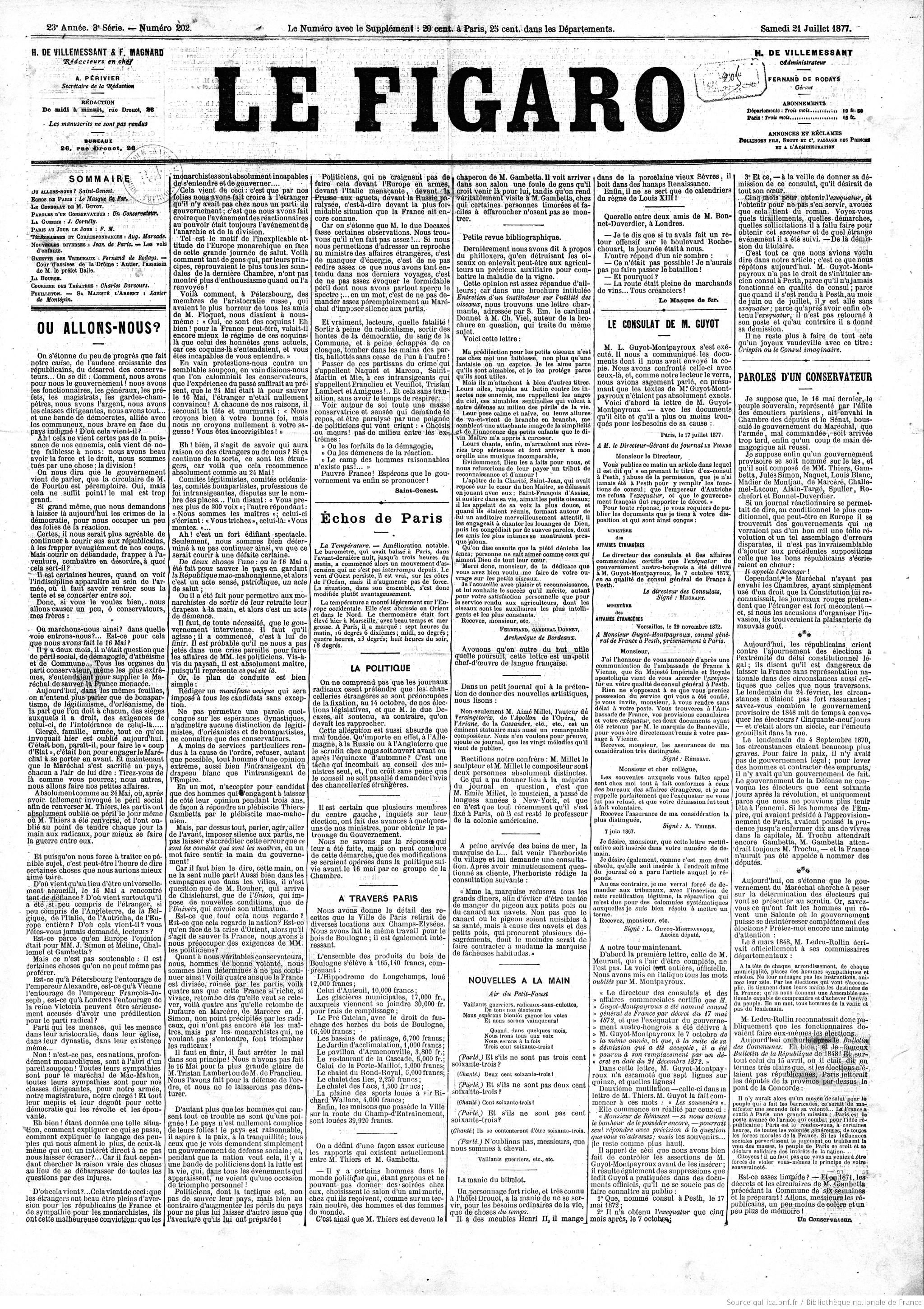
Editorial by Emmanuel-Arthur Bucheron in Le Figaro.

General Auguste-Alexandre Ducrot was one of the key figures in the military conspiracy. Throughout the May 16th crisis, this staunch Legitimist – he had been elected on that ticket in 1871 – sought to overthrow the Third Republic in order to restore the Comte de Chambord to the French throne.

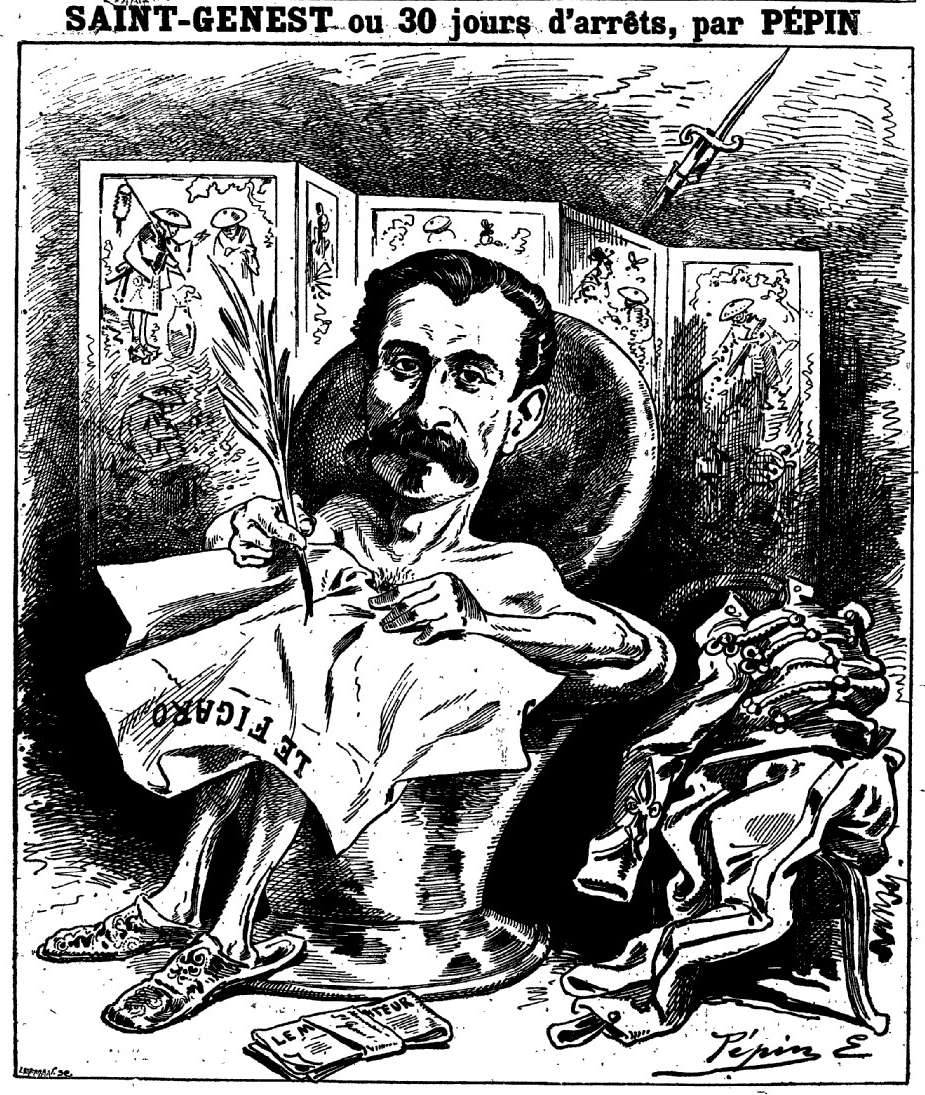
Cartoon in Le Grelot about Saint-Genest's conviction.

He first came to prominence in the summer of 1877, when conservative newspapers, led by the Bonapartist dailies Le Figaro and Le Pays, called for a état de siege in France. A journalist using the pseudonym Saint-Genest, Emmanuel-Arthur Bucheron, published editorials sharply criticizing the passivity of the Minister of War, General Berthaut, in the face of the unrest fomented by the Republicans. Le Moniteur universel quickly accused General Ducrot of having inspired these articles, sparking off a veritable polemic and forcing the Ministry of Armed Forces to issue a denial in a note published in the Journal Officiel, stressing that its "spirit of duty and discipline [...] is too well known for such allegations to be believed" and sentencing Bucheron (who was a reserve lieutenant) to 30 days' imprisonment.

In November 1877, Ducrot again played a central role: it was he who proposed to Mac Mahon the formation of a military cabinet in which he would receive the interior portfolio. When this combination failed, General Ducrot informed Gaëtan de Rochebouët, then commander of the 18th Corps, that the president had asked him to form the new cabinet and that Rochebouët had been summoned to Paris on November 18. He urged Rochebouët to accept, setting as a precondition "that you be allowed to make any changes in the ministerial staff and the garrisons of Paris and Versailles that you deem indispensable, under your responsibility," as a means of bypassing Mac Mahon. After Rochebouët's appointment, the new president of the council called General Joseph de Miribel to his side as chief of the general staff. Since Miribel was Ducrot's former chief of staff, Henri Brisson's report concluded that "[Rochebouët] asked Ducrot not only for inspiration but also for collaborators. The newspaper Le Temps agreed, noting that Ducrot "seems to have a certain influence in the Ministry of War.

=== Conspiracy of December 1877 ===
==== Military arrangements ====
Inspired by General Ducrot, a possible military conspiracy may have been orchestrated by the Minister of War and his Chief of Staff in December 1877. However, information on this subject is fragmentary, making it difficult to form an overall picture of military preparations. Documents and facts related to unusual orders are as followsː

- Gaëtan de Rochebouët did not appoint a general to succeed him at the head of the 18th Corps for the duration of his government. This unusual measure could be a prelude to a large-scale movement by the generals to prepare a coup, or it could simply be explained by Rochebouët's desire to return to his duties as soon as his "transitional" government was over (which was exactly what happened after December 13).
- On November 27 and 28, "confidential instructions" from Rochebouët reached General Lallemand (15th Corps, Marseille) and General Bourbaki (14th Corps, Lyon): the former was to "bring back weapons belonging to private individuals to Fort Saint-Jean", while the latter asked for a state of siege to be declared.
- On November 28, a 24-pounder cannon was sent to Versailles, causing a stir.
- On December 5, Rochebouët informed Bourbaki that "the troublemakers would be aware of the orders given to [his] chefs de corps. In the event of disturbances, [his] confidential instructions would not be kept secret" and asked Ducrot to "prohibit all movements of division generals, except by ministerial order," in accordance with the verbal instructions Ducrot had already received from him.
- On December 9, the 5th Corps (Orléans) asked the sub-prefects of the region to send two days' worth of mobilization supplies to the barracks. These measures were also taken by other corps, such as the 12th Corps (Limoges).
- On December 10, Rochebouët summoned all the regional commanding generals to Paris.
- On December 11, Ducrot met with Rochebouët. There, according to Henri Brisson, "the final decisions were taken".
- On December 13, General Bressolles gave instructions to his men "in case of disturbances in the city".
- On the same day, Rochebouet informed the 18th Corps that he was returning to take command and that "all preparations for departure should be halted".

It also appears that orders were being prepared for all corps units to leave in the event of a coup d'état. Colonel Théodore Fix, Chief of Staff of the 1st Infantry Division, wrote in his memoirs that he discovered these orders a few months later when he accidentally opened a confidential envelope. According to Captain Bernard Lamarque, a Bonapartist cavalry colonel had received orders to arrest the Duc de Chartres (a member of the House of Orléans), who was then chef de corps in the same division as himself.

Main generals suspected of supporting the military coup project

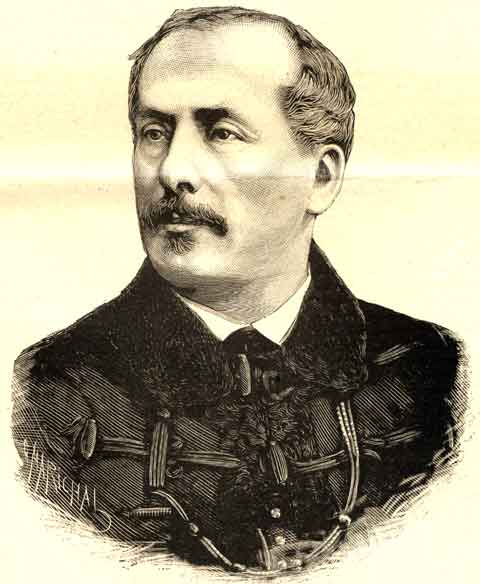
Joseph de Miribel, Chief of General Staff.

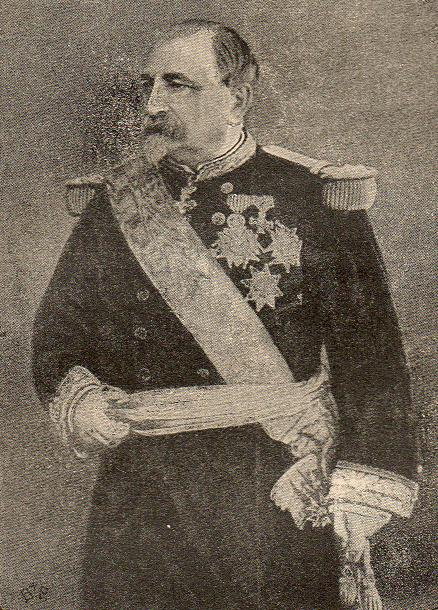
Henri Jules Bataille, commander of the 5th army corps, Bonapartist.

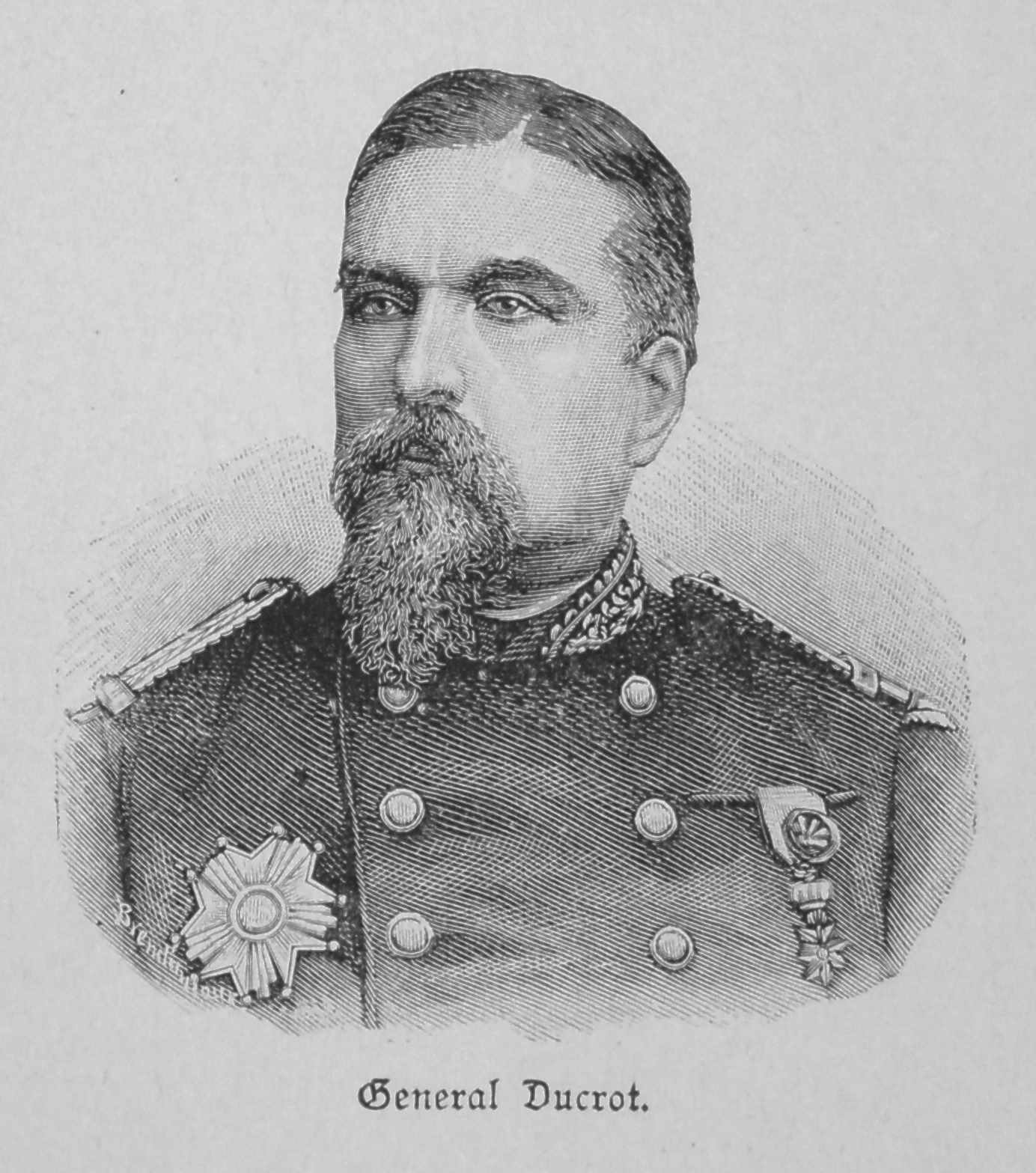
Auguste-Alexandre Ducrot, commander of the 8th army corps, Legitimist.

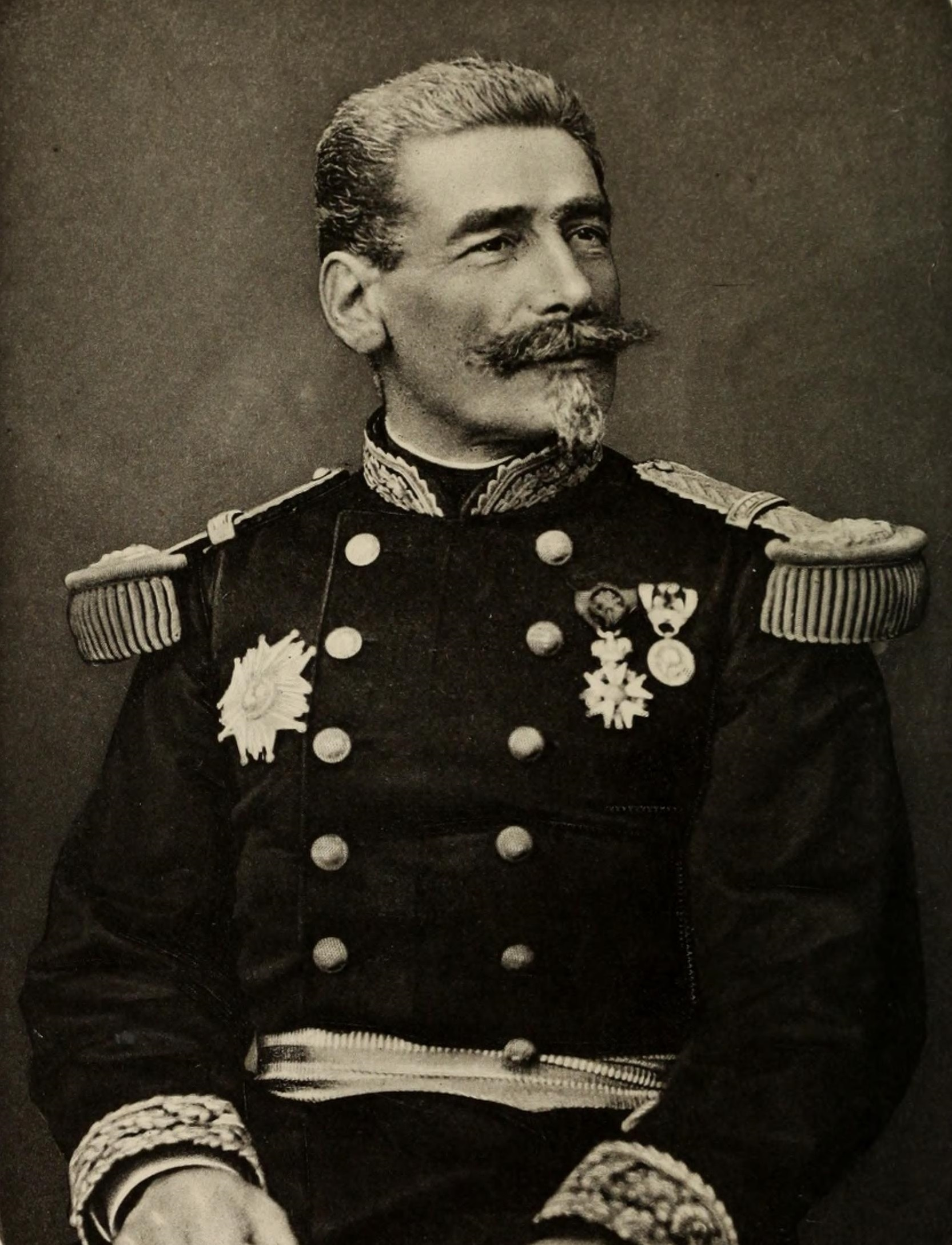
François Charles du Barail, commander of the 9th army corps, Bonapartist.

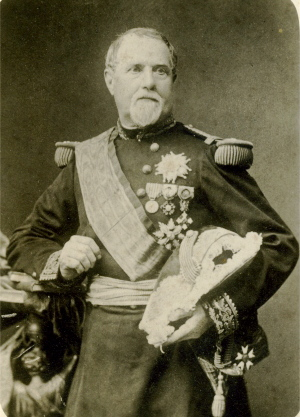
Henri Espivent de La Villesboisnet, commander of the 11th army corps, Legitimist.

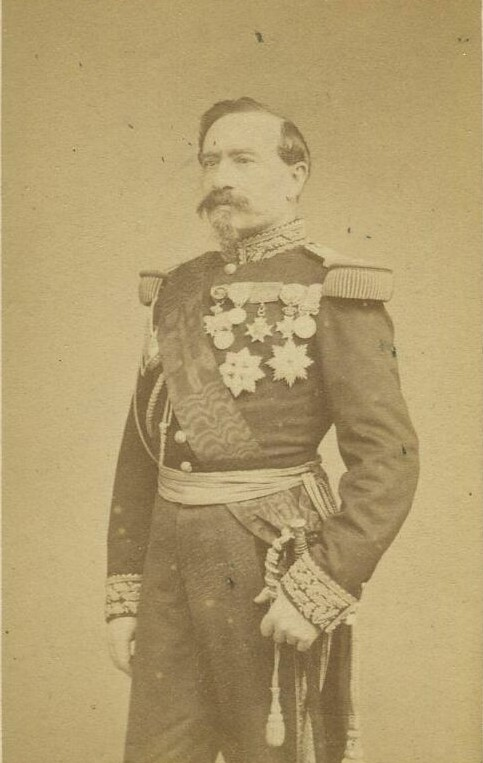
Charles-Denis Bourbaki, commander of the 14th Corps, Bonapartist.

==== Incident in Limoges (December 13th) ====
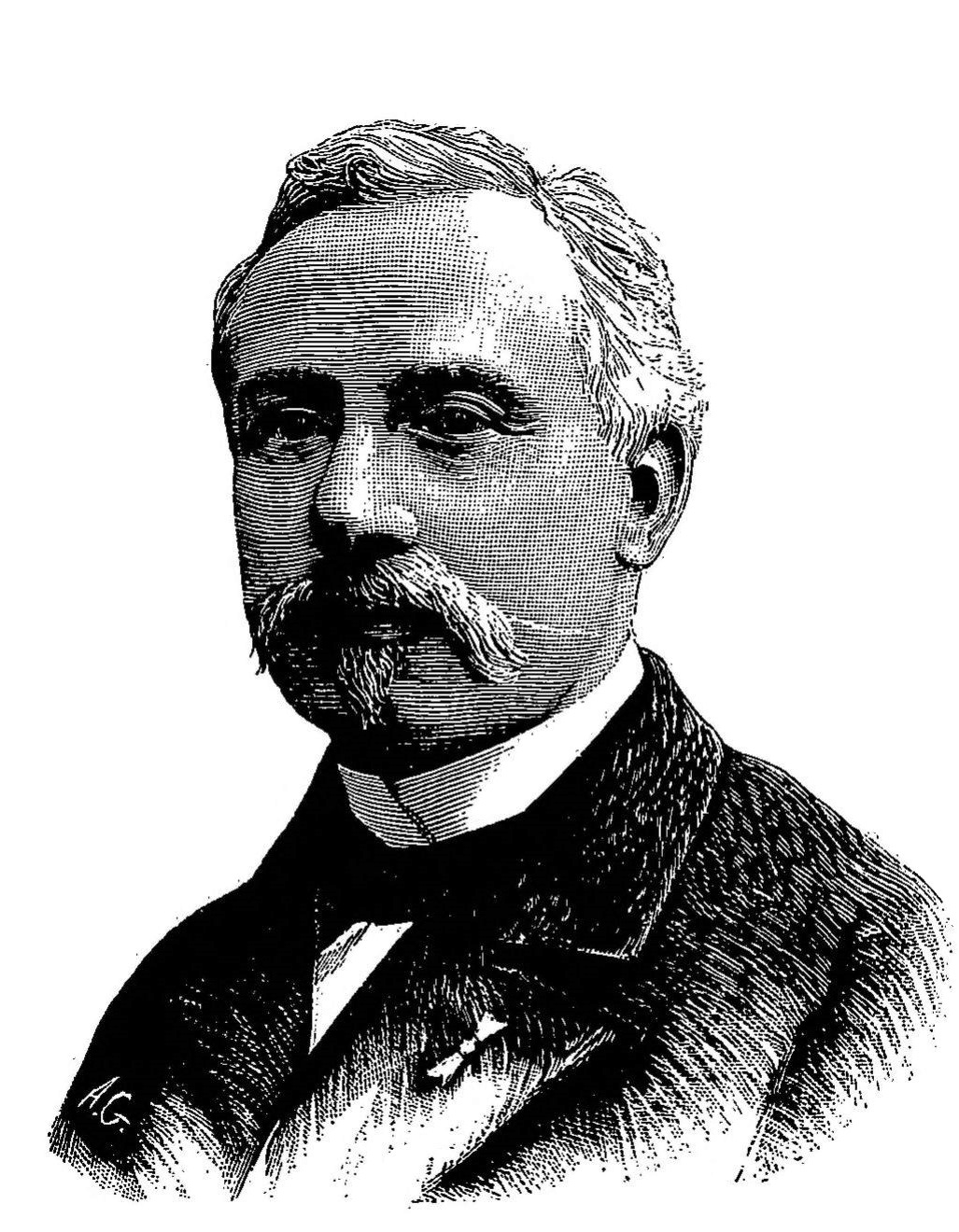
Commandant Jean-Marie-Arthur Labordère, the man behind the "Limoges incident".

On December 13, 1877, the commander of the 14th infantry regiment, stationed in Limoges, summoned his officers to inform them of General Antoine-Aubin Bressolles's instructions "in case of disturbances in the city". Major Jean-Marie-Arthur Labordère, outraged, told his superior that "[a coup] is a crime; I will not be an accomplice [...]. I will not play the role reserved for me in this criminal attempt". On December 31, he was dismissed as a result of this insubordination.

According to the Major's own account, collected for the Brisson report, "none of us could or did doubt that it was a coup d'état and that we would have to take up arms that very night". In March 1878, following the publication of the report, the republicans reinstated the major in active service, while General Bressolles himself was placed on leave, accused of having exceeded his orders and "transformed measures of foresight into measures of execution".

However, the historian Xavier Boniface believes that Labordère's fears were no longer justified, since on December 13, the military plot had been definitively ruled out and Gaëtan de Rochebouët's government had decided to leave office.

==== Army loyalty ====
Although the military command may have considered a military coup, it was never carried out. The failure or reluctance of the most anti-republican officers to challenge the government can be attributed to several factors. Firstly, Marshal de Mac Mahon's opposition to a coup was decisive, as the president had the support of the army. Additionally, the introduction of military service resulted in officers gradually becoming more accustomed to the Republic. The political neutrality enforced upon career military officers is one explanation for the absence of a coup d'état.

Additionally, it is feasible that the army opted against pursuing a risky endeavor while Germany remained a significant threat. In accordance with patriotism, the army chose to avoid internal divisiveness and refrain from opposing universal suffrage. In 1876, during a debate at the Conseil supérieur de la guerre, General Ernest Courtot de Cissey responded to those who discussed the potential of a coup d'état with the following: "It's a valid point. I concur that success is important. However, what happens next?".

=== Republican counter-insurgency project ===
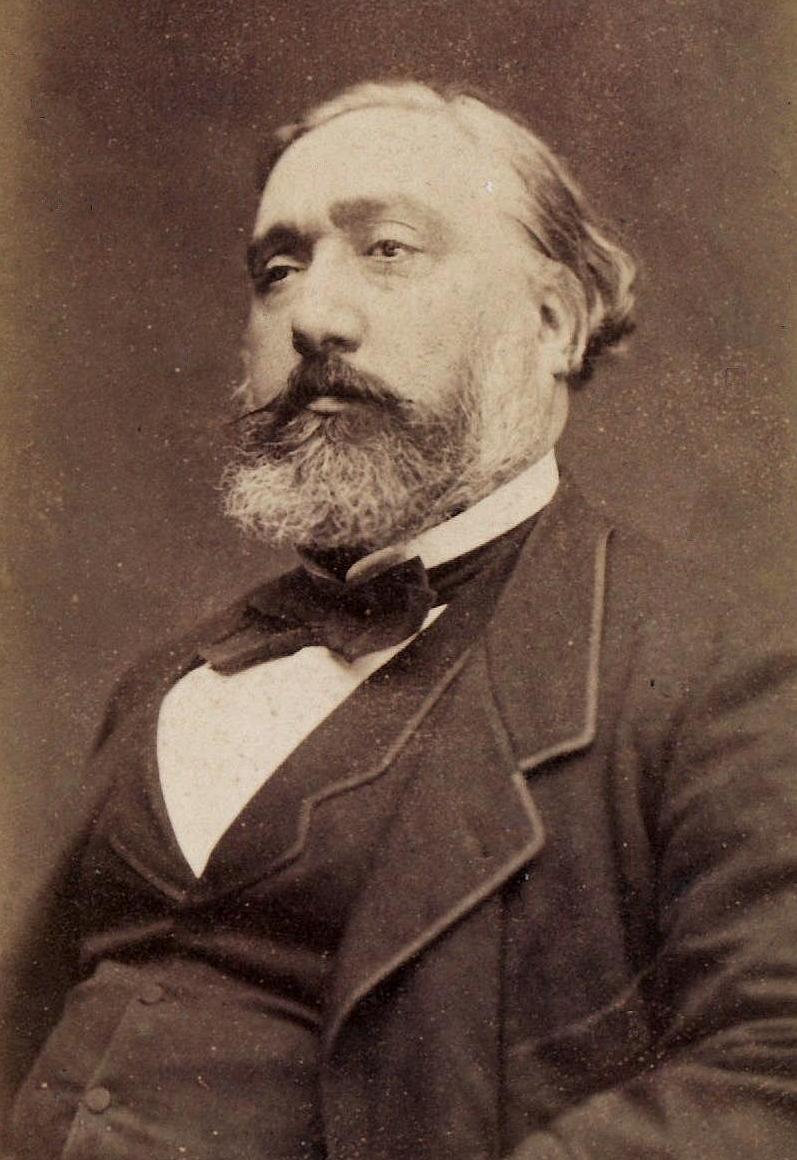
Léon Gambetta, leader of the Republican Union parliamentary group.

At the onset of the crisis, radical Republicans harbored apprehensions about the likelihood of a possible military coup. Léon Gambetta, the most commanding among them, devised a strategy to head a counter-insurrection with the backing of a Republican general officers' network. Gambetta asked General de Wimpffen to create plans for the uprising, as General Justin Clinchant, the military governor of Lille and the only Republican among the 18 generals involved, commanded the 1st Corps. Gambetta proposed that the members of parliament who had evaded capture by the putschists would retreat to Lille.

Gambetta asked General de Wimpffen to create plans for the uprising, as General Justin Clinchant, the military governor of Lille and the only Republican among the 18 generals involved, commanded the 1st Corps. Wimpffen devised a plan to sabotage the telegraph wires connecting Versailles and the provinces. Additionally, he aimed to reinstate the mayors, prefects, and sub-prefects who were dismissed during the May 16th crisis, dismiss a substantial number of generals, and compel Patrice de Mac Mahon to resign.

Other officers who volunteered to assist Gambetta in defending the Third Republic against a possible monarchist uprising included General Farre, General Campenon (Clinchant's chief of staff), and General Lecointe. The commander of the 7th Corps (Besançon), the Duc d'Aumale, also supported Gambetta, fearing that the coup would strengthen the Bonapartists at the expense of the Orleanists. Lastly, General Gaston de Galliffet (commander of the 15th infantry division), whom Gambetta had met on numerous occasions, asserted: "What I would defend in the government is the majority." He also drew attention with a toast in front of a significant number of officers. "To the Army, which remains impartial in civil conflicts and adheres strictly to its professional duties!".

However, the preparations were constrained by increasing Republican apprehensions over Gambetta's close association with the military and his possible leanings towards Caesarism." Many officers feared being associated with Gambetta, as it could harm their career prospects in a conservative-leaning corps. General de Galliffet's close ties with the radical tribunal seem to have hindered his advancement.

== Consequences ==
=== Use in Republican propaganda ===
In the spring and autumn of 1877, rumors of a potential military coup d'état were perpetuated by the Republicans. These claims were based on Mac Mahon's speech to the army on July 1, 1877, where he declared to soldiers: "Objective evaluations were excluded, and causal connections between statements were established". The country has entrusted you with the guardianship of its most cherished interests. On every occasion, I count on you to defend them. You will help me maintain respect for authority and the law." After the crisis was resolved, the accusations resurfaced with greater specificity. The Republicans magnified the supposed "temptation of a coup d'état".

On January 6, 1878, L'Estafette, a Bonapartist newspaper, released documents regarding the potential military plot from December 1877, alongside a detailed account of the attempted coup. The Republicans leveraged the situation entirely for political gain. The Left sought to conquer the State, but the officer corps represented a significant obstacle due to their conservative views; 88% of its major generals were monarchists. As a result, the Republicans used any information that could tarnish the military leaders' reputation, even if it required purposefully exaggerating the event.

In a statement released in the Journal Officiel on December 31, 1877, the Ministry of War restated the army's responsibility to restore public order "in the event of disturbances" and highlighted that the conscription law of 1872 resulted in the departure of the class of 1872 in the fall of 1877, which substantially reduced the armed forces stationed in Paris. This unique circumstance required the designation of units to be deployed in the capital on November 14, which was later revised on December 8. According to the memo, the Limoges incident was caused by the over-interpretation of these provisions labelled as "foresight" by General Bressolles.

To illuminate the matter and challenge the army's traditionalism within social issues, the commission assigned to investigate the legislative elections of October 1877, led by the newly Republican-dominated Chamber, opted to expand their inquiry into the supposed conspiracy of December 1877. The Chamber of Deputies received the report on March 9, 1878, from the progressive representative Henri Brisson who left no doubt about the "existence of the plot"ː

"The intention to resist the national will has been formed; the resolution to act has been taken, the agents of execution have been chosen, the military dispositions have been ordered, the orders to march have been given [...]. Military preparations have been pushed to the most minute detail."

However, historian Xavier Boniface believes that Brisson may have overestimated the significance of the "sometimes cryptic" telegrams analyzed by the commission.

=== Purge of monarchist officers ===
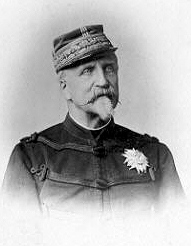
Henri d'Orléans, duke of Aumale, dismissed as corps commander in 1879, placed on inactive status in 1883 and exiled from France in 1886 because of his membership of the House of Orléans.

As soon as the May 16 crisis was resolved and the republican cabinet of Jules Dufaure took office, Marshal de Mac Mahon was forced to sacrifice three generals with suspicious attitudes: among them, General Ducrot and General Bressolles were dismissed and lost their command.

After the victory of the left in the senatorial elections of 1879, the purge of general officers with monarchist convictions continued, affecting some of the instigators of the alleged military conspiracy of December 1877. On January 28, 1879, General Gresley, a liberal officer appointed to the Ministry of War by the center-left, asked the president of the Republic to dismiss five major generals who held corps commands: Henri Jules Bataille, Charles-Denis Bourbaki, François-Charles du Barail, Jean-Baptiste Alexandre Montaudon and Marie-Hippolyte de Lartigue (General Bressoles' superior in the 12th Corps). In addition to these five officers, known for their hostility to the Republic, the Minister requested the dismissal of five other corps commanders. The Duc d'Aumale lost command of the 7th Corps, and two Bonapartists, Édouard Deligny and Félix Charles Douay, left command of the 4th and 6th Corps respectively, all three being appointed general inspectors of the army. (Note: François Roth makes a different assessment: for him, Bourbaki, Bataille and Lartigue are retired, while Aumale, Barail, Deligny, Douai and Montaudon are laid off.)

Refusing to accept what he considered a dishonor, Mac Mahon resigned, ushering in the "Republic of the Republicans". His successor as President of the Republic, the Republican Jules Grévy, signed the decrees for this purge without a second thought. In fact, the only general who might have been involved in the December 1877 plot and who remained in a prominent position after this political change was Joseph de Miribel, who, despite his reactionary views and the role he might have played in the attempted coup, was held in high esteem by Léon Gambetta, who called him back to the prestigious post of army chief of staff in 1881.

== Bibliography ==
=== College publications ===
- .Halévy, Daniel (1937), Hachette (ed.), La Fin des notablesː La République des ducs (in French), Paris, p. 384
- Bédarida, François (1964), "L'Armée et la Républiqueː Les opinions politiques des officiers français en 1876-78", Revue Historique (in French), 232 (1), Paris: 119–164, JSTOR 40949869, archived from the original on 24 August 2023 (read online archive).
  - Error in page 139ː Since September 1877, General d'Espivent has commanded the 11th Corps (Nantes) instead of the 15th Corps (Marseille).
- Pisani-Ferry, Fresnette (1965), Laffont, Robert (ed.), Le coup d'État manqué du 16 mai 1877 (in French), Paris, p. 384
- Roth, François (1999), "Mac Mahon, le maréchal président (24 may 1873 - 30 january 1879)", in Publications de la Sorbonne (ed.), Militaires en République (1870-1962)ː Les officiers, le pouvoir et la vie publique en France (in French), Paris, pp. 111–122, ISBN 9782859443627, archived from the original on 20 September 2023
- Boniface, Xavier (8 April 2018), "Le loyalisme républicain de l'armée dans la crise du Seize-Mai 1877", in Publications de l’Institut de recherches historiques du Septentrion (ed.), Le Seize-mai revisité (in French), Paris, pp. 79–93, ISBN 978-2-490296-14-9, archived from the original on 20 November 2023

=== Historic documents ===
- Brisson, Henri (9 March 1878), "Rapport fait au nom de la commission chargée de faire une enquête parlementaire sur les élections des 14 et 28 octobre 1877", Journal officiel, Débats parlementairesː Chambre des députés (in French), Paris, pp. 1838–1845
- du Barail, François Charles (1898), Plon et Nourrit (ed.), "Mes souvenirs, t. 3ː 1864-1879", Journal officiel, Débats parlementairesː Chambre des députés (in French), Paris, pp. 1838–1845, archived from the original on 24 August 2023
