= Battle of Amiens =

Battle of Amiens may refer to:

- Battle of Amiens (1358), during the Hundred Years' War
- Battle of Amiens (1870), during the Franco-Prussian War
- Battle of Amiens (1918), during the First World War
- Battle of Amiens (1940), during the Second World War

== See also ==
- Siege of Amiens (disambiguation)
