= Battle of Villers-Bretonneux =

Battle of Villers-Bretonneux can refer to:

- Battle of Amiens (1870) (27 November 1870), also known as the Battle of Villers-Bretonneux, during the Franco-Prussian War
- First Battle of Villers-Bretonneux (30 March – 5 April 1918) during World War I
- Second Battle of Villers-Bretonneux (24–27 April 1918) during World War I
