= Charles Welche =

French lawyer and politician (1828–1902)

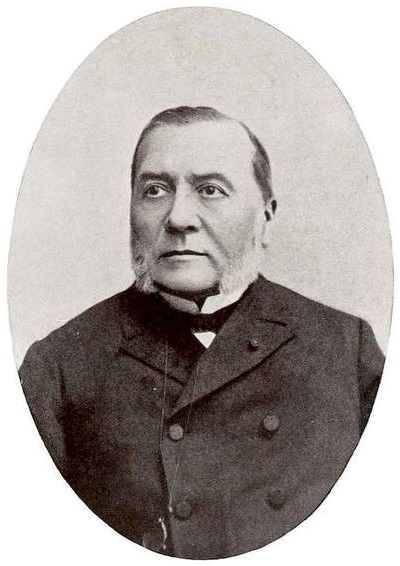

102nd Minister of the Interior
- In office 23 November 1877 – 13 December 1877
- President: Patrice de MacMahon
- Prime Minister: Gaëtan de Rochebouët
- Preceded by: Oscar Bardi de Fourtou
- Succeeded by: Émile de Marcère

Personal details
- Born: 23 April 1828 Nancy, Kingdom of France
- Died: 9 May 1902 (aged 74) Paris, Third French Republic

Charles Nicolas Welche (23 April 1828 – 9 May 1902) was a French lawyer and politician. He served as Minister of the Interior from November to December 1877. He also pursued a career as prefect in several departments, as well as Mayor of Nancy.
