= Alphonse Lecointe =

French general and politician

Major General Alphonse Lecointe

Senator
- In office 26 February 1882 – 23 December 1890

Personal details
- Born: 12 July 1817 Évreux, France
- Died: 23 December 1890 (aged 73) Paris, France
- Education: École spéciale militaire de Saint-Cyr
- Profession: Soldier

Military service
- Allegiance: Kingdom of France; French Second Republic; Second French Empire; French Third Republic
- Branch/service: French Army
- Years of service: 1837–1871, 1873–1890
- Rank: Major general
- Commands: 2nd Grenadier Regiment; 1st Division; 17th Corps; 14th Corps; Inspector general of the infantry; Military governor of Lyon; Military governor of Paris
- Battles/wars: Crimean War; Battle of the Alma; Battle of Malakoff; Pacification of Algeria; Campaign of Kabylie; Second Italian War of Independence; Battle of Magenta; Franco-Prussian War; Battle of Mars-la-Tour; Siege of Metz; Battle of Amiens; Battle of Hallue; Battle of Bapaume; Battle of St. Quentin
- Awards: Grand Officer of the Legion of Honour; Commemorative medal of the 1859 Italian Campaign

Alphonse-Théodore Lecointe (12 July 1817, Évreux – 23 December 1890, Paris) was a French general and politician.

== Biography ==
=== Early life and career ===
Lecointe was the son of Jacques-Pierre Lecointe, a major of infantry. He entered the French military academy at Saint-Cyr in 1837 and successively was promoted to sous-lieutenant (second lieutenant) of infantry in 1839, lieutenant in 1842, capitaine (captain) in 1848, and major in 1854.

=== Crimean War ===
Lecointe took part in the Crimean War (1854–1856) as a battalion commander attached to the army of Général de division Pierre Bosquet and participated in the Battle of the Alma on 20 September 1854 and the Battle of Malakoff on 8 September 1855. In 1857 he took part in the Algeria in the Campaign of Kabylie in Algeria during the pacification of Algeria and seized Borj Mawlay Hasan (known to the French as Fort l'Empereur).

=== Second Italian War of Independence ===
Lecointe returned to France in 1859 at the time of the Second Italian War of Independence. His division, the well-proven grenadier division of the Imperial Guard Corps, which belonged to the III Corps under the command of General Patrice de MacMahon, contributed to the French success in the Battle of Magenta on 4 June 1859 by clearing Buffalora. Wounded the same day, he was promoted to lieutenant colonel on 18 June 1859. He was stationed with the garrison of Paris after the war and was promoted to colonel in 1864.

=== Franco-Prussian War ===
In 1866, Lecointe took command of the 2nd Grenadier Regiment of the Imperial Guard Corps. With the outbreak of the Franco-Prussian War in July 1870, he led the regiment as part of the Army of the Rhine. He was wounded during the Battle of Mars-la-Tour on 16 August 1870 and was surrounded in Metz with the rest of the Army of the Rhine on 19 August 1870, beginning the 70-day Siege of Metz.

When Metz capitulated in October 1870, Lecointe escaped and joined the Army of the North, led first by Général de division Charles-Denis Bourbaki and then provisionally by Général de brigade Jean-Joseph Farre. On 14 November 1870, he was given command of a brigade of the 22nd Corps. After the defeat of the Army of the North in the Battle of Amiens on 27 November 1870, its retirement from Amiens, and the appointment of Général de division Louis Faidherbe as its new commander, Lecointe took part under Faidherbe in the Battle of Hallue on 23–24 December 1870, the Battle of Bapaume on 3 January 1871, and the Battle of St. Quentin on 19 January 1871. German forces having cut off all communications between the Army of the North and the rest of France, the 22nd Corps, which still had 18,000 men and 60 guns, received orders to embark at Dunkirk to rally at Cherbourg-en-Cotentin for operations in Normandy.

=== Later military career ===
Promoted to major general on 16 September 1871, Lecointe was placed in reserve. He was recalled to active duty in 1873 as commander of the 1st Division of I Corps in Lille. He took command of the 17th Corps in Toulouse in 1878, then of the 14th Corps at Lyon in 1879. In January 1880, he became military governor of Lyon. When General Justin Clinchant died in 1881, Lecointe replaced him as military governor of Paris in 1882, holding the position until 1884.

=== Political career ===
After Jean-Louis Lepouzé died soon after his election as senator of Eure was invalidated, Lecointe was elected to the French Senate to replace him on 26 February 1882. He sympathized with the political left, supported the republican ministries, and was re-elected on 6 January 1885. He continued to support the left and vote with the republicans the senate, but abstained from voting on the expulsion of princes. Finally, he spoke out for the reinstatement of the district ballot, for the Lisbon bill restricting press freedom, and for the procedure to be followed before the Senate against General Georges Ernest Boulanger. He served as a senator until his death.

As a reward for his combat service, Lecointe was kept on active duty, without age limit, when he reached the French Army's mandatory retirement age of 65 in 1882.

== Awards and honors ==
- Grand Officer of the Legion of Honour
- Commemorative medal of the 1859 Italian Campaign

== Sources ==
- "Alphonse Lecointe," in Adolphe Robert and Gaston Cougny, Dictionnaire des parlementaires français, Edgar Bourloton, 1889-1891 (in French)
