= Battle of Amiens (1870) =

1870 battle of the Franco-Prussian War

- Part of the Franco-Prussian War
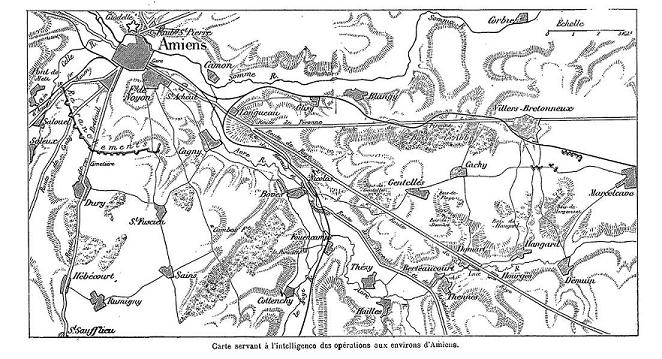
- A map of Amiens and vicinity during the battle.
Date	27 November 1870
Location	Amiens, France 49.8675°N 2.5208°E
Result	German victory

Belligerents
North German Confederation: Prussia	French Republic

Commanders and leaders
Edwin Freiherr von Manteuffel; August Karl von Goeben	Jean-Joseph Farre; Antoine Paulze d`Ivoy de la Poype

Strength
43,000	25,000 (Note: The estimated size of the Army of the North in the Battle of Amiens varies widely. Hozier, pp. 158 and 160, credits it with 50,000 men before the battle and 45,000 afterward. More recent sources assess its strength as much lower. Howard, p. 374, asserts that its strength was 17,000 prior to the battle, while Bruce places its strength at 25,000 men. Other sources estimate the strength of the army as somewhere between Howard′s and Bruce′s estimates, often claiming a strength of 22,000 to 23,000.)

Casualties and losses
1,292 killed or wounded 300 missing	1,383 killed or wounded 1,000 soldiers missing
- Location within France

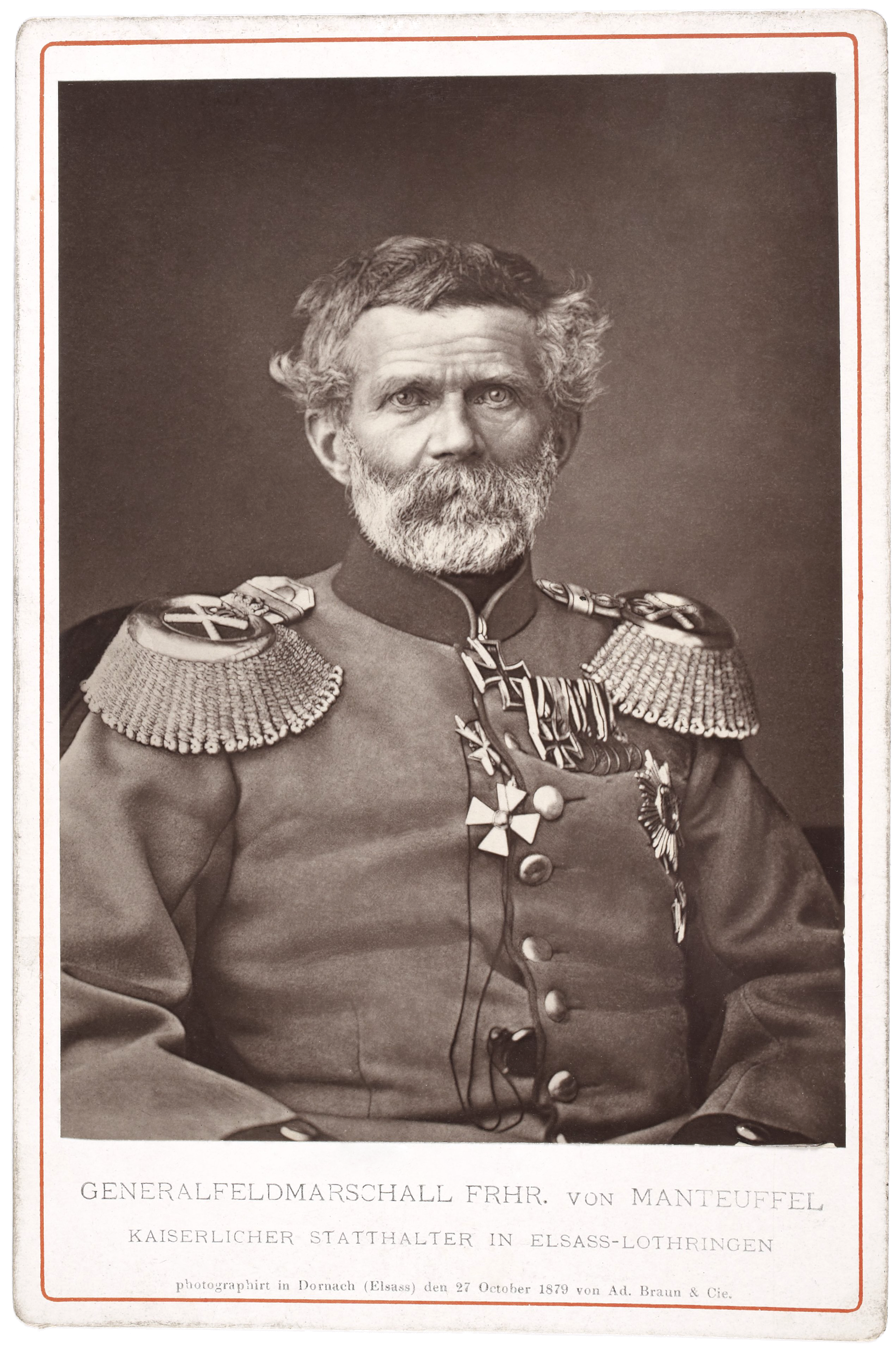
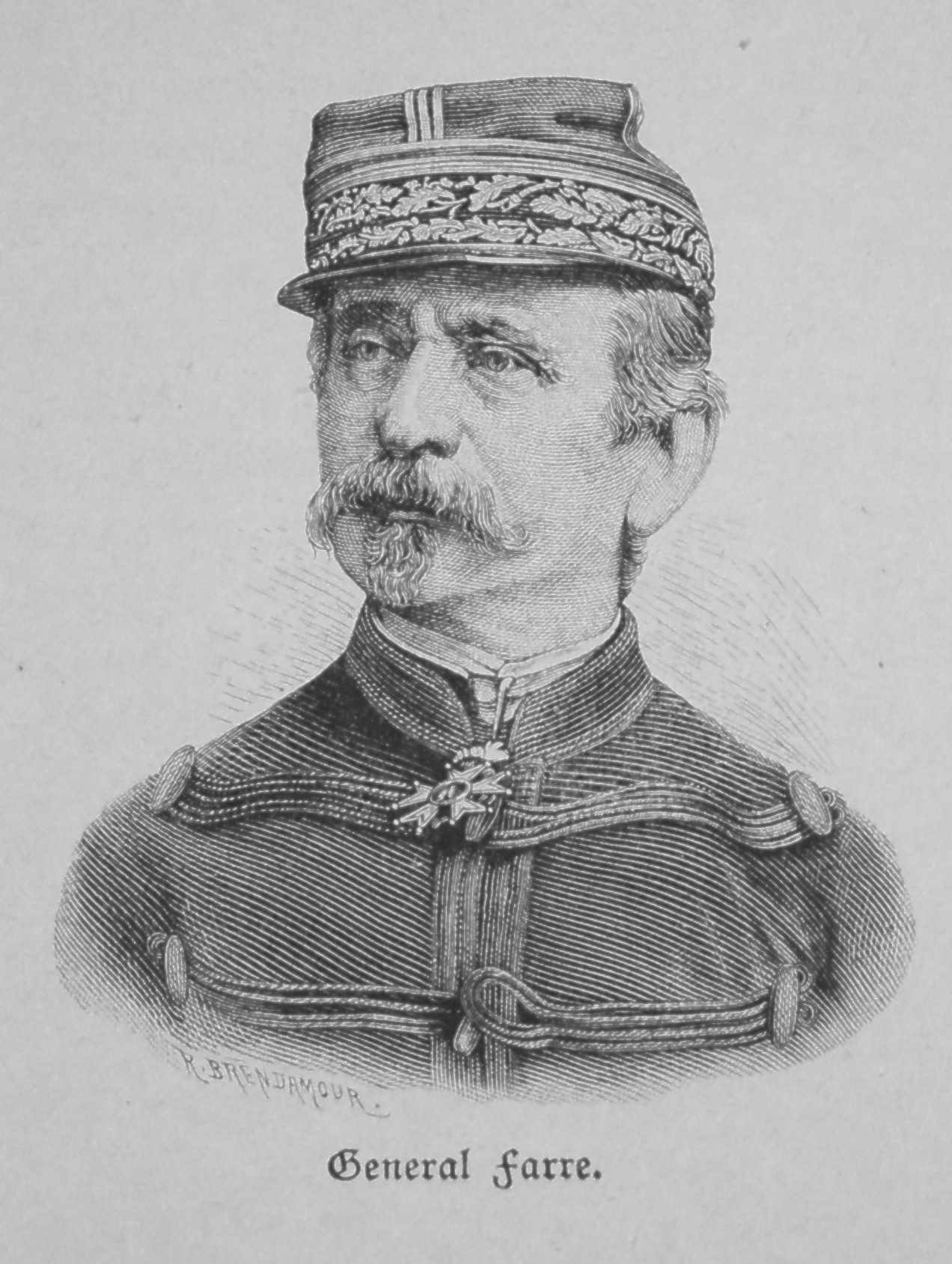
LEFT: Edwin Freiherr von Manteuffel RIGHT: Jean-Joseph Farre.

The Battle of Amiens, also known as the Battle of Villers-Bretonneux, was fought on 27 November 1870 between French and Prussian forces during the Franco-Prussian War (1870–1871). It ended in a Prussian victory, forcing the French to retreat and allowing the Prussians to capture Amiens, France.

== Background ==
After the outbreak of the Franco-Prussian War on 19 July 1870, the Prussian Army and the armies of its allies — the other states of the North German Confederation and the independent states in southern Germany — scored a series of victories over the French Army in eastern France. These culminated in the Battle of Sedan and the Siege of Metz. At Sedan, German forces encircled and destroyed the French Army of Châlons on 1–2 September 1870 and captured Emperor Napoleon III, prompting a Government of National Defense to form in Paris on 4 September 1870 and declare an end to the Second French Empire and the foundation of the French Third Republic. The capitulation of Metz on 27 October 1870 after a 70-day siege resulted in the annihilation of the French Army of the Rhine and completed the defeat of the Second Empire's army. The Government of National Defense vowed to raise a new army for the Third Republic and fight on.

Colonel Jean-Joseph Farre, was present at Metz but escaped when Metz surrendered and made his services available to the Government of National Defense, which appointed him military governor of Lille in the north of France. At Lille, he set to work raising units for a new French army in northern France. By the time Général de division Charles-Denis Bourbaki, the general-in-chief of the northern region, arrived to take command of the new army, named the Army of the North, Farre had raised 14 battalions of troops and six artillery batteries. Bourbaki and Farre continued to expand and train the army; promoted to général de brigade on 31 October 1870, Farre became its provisional commander — pending the arrival of a more senior officer to take command — when Bourbaki transferred to the Armée de l'Est at Rouen on 10 November 1870. The French hoped that the new Army of the North could advance successfully on Beauvais.

Among the German forces freed up by the capitulation of Metz was the Prussian First Army, a force of 43,000 men and 180 guns under the command of Generalleutnant Edwin Freiherr von Manteuffel. In early November 1870, Manteuffel received orders from the Prussian Army chief of staff, Generalfeldmarschall Helmuth von Moltke the Elder, to move northwestward into northern France, marching through the Oise and the Somme between Compiègne and Saint-Quentin, and to occupy Amiens and then march towards Rouen in order to strengthen the defenses along the northern flank of the German forces that had begun the Siege of Paris in September 1870. The Prussian staff believed that all the French troops in northern France were under the command of Bourbaki and formed a single, unified army covering the railroad which connected Rouen, Amiens, and Lille — in particular the section from Rouen to Amiens —with its right at Rouen, its center at Amiens, and its left at Lille.

== Opening moves ==
Manteuffel's army halted at Rheims on 9 November 1870, but resumed its advance on 17 November, reaching Soissons on 19 November and Compiègne on 21 November. On 22 November 1870, Manteuffel sent a reconnaissance force forward which pushed as far as the Gentelles Wood near Amiens and reported that Bourbaki was present at Amiens. Bourbaki had, in fact, spent the previous day there before heading for Rouen. The Prussians had learned from the newspapers that Bourbaki had been relieved of his command of the Army of the North, but apparently believed that he would remain in command of it at least until the arrival of his successor, rather than turn over provisional command of the army to the relatively junior Farre. The Prussians supposed that, in his journey from Lille to Amiens and from Amiens to Rouen, Bourbaki had no other goal than to bring the left and right wings of his supposedly unified army together to concentrate around Amiens at the center of the line the Prussians thought he was maintaining in northern France. Leaving behind the 4th Brigade (under Generalmajor Karl von Zglinitzki) of the I Corps's 2nd Division to begin a siege of the French fortress at La Fère on 25 November, and without waiting for the rest of the 1st Army to concentrate its forces fully along the line of the Oise, Manteuffel decided to attack what he thought was Bourbaki's concentration of the Army of the North at Amiens with a portion of the 1st Army totaling 40,000 men. It consisted of the Prussian VIII Corps, a portion of the Prussian I Corps, a cavalry division, and 180 artillery pieces.

After Manteuffel's army left Compiègne, the French lost track of it until 24 November, when a large French force made up mostly of members of the Garde Mobile defeated a detachment forming Manteuffel's advance guard in a sharp skirmish in the Santerre region in the eastern Somme. The same day, French forces reported Prussian scouts in the vicinity of Amiens. The skirmish and the arrival of Prussian scouts made it clear to Farre that Manteuffel was advancing on Amiens. Farre's Army of the North was still forming and by late November consisted of only the 22nd Corps, which in turn was made up of only three brigades — a total of only between 17,000 and 17,500 regular troops — and an additional 8,000 Garde Mobile troops and 12 guns from the Amiens garrison under the command of General Antoine Paulze d`Ivoy de la Poype and charged with the defense of the city. In additional to its numerical advantage, the Prussian 1st Army also had better equipment and better-trained and more experienced troops than the Army of the North. Nonetheless, to prevent the Prussians from occupying Amiens without a fight, Farre did not hesitate to place his army in front of the advancing Prussians.

Entrenchments existed just outside Amiens, but Farre deemed them too weak and too close to the city. He chose to make his stand east, southeast, and south of Amiens along a line about 25 kilometres (16 mi) in length. It ran south from the left bank of the Somme at Corbie and Villers-Bretonneux — about 12 miles (19 km) east of Amiens — and the Hangard Wood, a good defense position facing southeast in which Farre deployed a strong force. The French line then ran southwest to Boves (southeast of Amiens), and from there west to Hébécourt (south of Amiens) and then to Pont-de-Metz (southwest of Amiens). Along this line, the Army of the North constructed strong earthworks and artillery emplacements. On the evening of 26 November 1870, Farre completed the concentration of his troops along the line. On the French left wing, Colonel Joseph Arthur Dufaure du Bessol's 3rd Brigade held the bulk of its forces at Villers-Bretonneux (commanding the road southeast to Tergnier), with detachments at Gentelles and Cachy. In the center, Colonel Joseph Derroja's 2nd Brigade held a line extending from the Montdidier road to Saint-Fuscien, passing through and centered on Boves (which commanded the road south to Paris). Farre originally intended to deploy General Alphonse Lecointe’s 1st Brigade to defend the entrenchments on the French right south of Amiens, but instead deployed Lecointe’s brigade in a position to support Bessol's 3rd Brigade around Villers-Bretonneux. The French right, centered on Dury — which lay west of Boves, south of Amiens, and north of Hébécourt and commanded the road south to Breteuil — therefore was defended by a mixed force consisting of three battalions of Garde Mobiles deployed from Pont-de-Metz eastward to the main road from Amiens through Dury and Hébécourt; a battalion of the 43rd Regiment, the 19th Chasseur Battalion, and two Fusiliers Marins companies in the vicinity of the road; and four Garde Mobile battalions to the east of the road. Behind the troops on the French right, the National Guard from Amiens formed a reserve. A 12-gun artillery battery, which had barely disembarked after arriving from Arras, occupied a shoulder which cut the road north of Dury, soon reinforced by a battery of four guns from the National Guard.

Manteuffel established his headquarters at Thennes, near the middle of the French line. He planned to attack with a force of 30,000 troops on the morning of 27 November 1870. His plan called for his I Corps was to advance beyond the Luce, a tributary of the Avre and a subtributary of the Somme, screened by the 3rd Cavalry Division, while his VIII Corps, under the command of August Karl von Goeben, was to protect the Prussian left flank. During the battle, the swampy valley of the Avre would preclude mutual support between the Prussian left wing, facing the French center and right at Boves and Dury, and the Prussian right wing, facing the French left at Villers-Bretonneux.

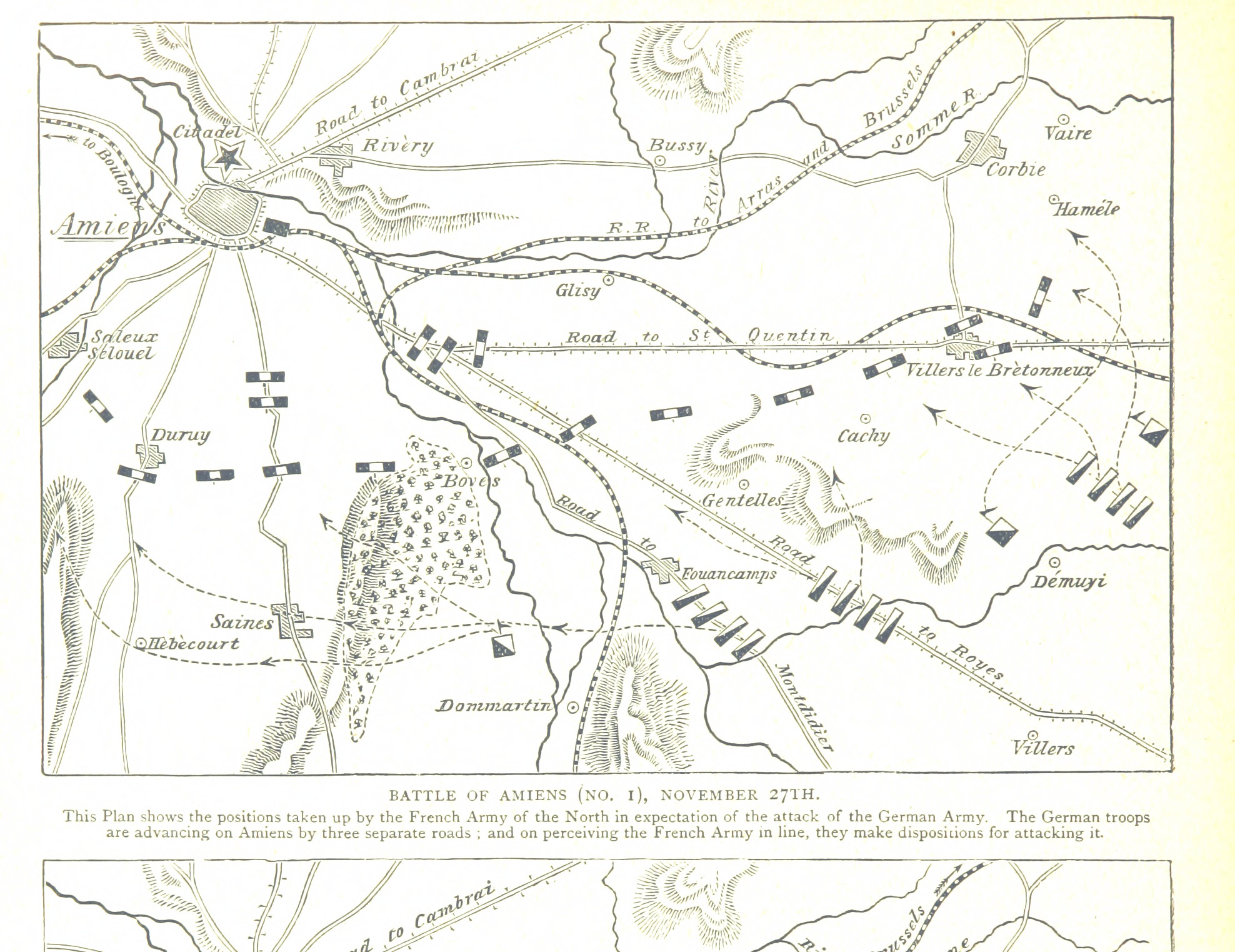
The Prussians deploy to attack the French positions between Dury (identified as "Duruy" at left) and Villers-Bretonneux (at right).

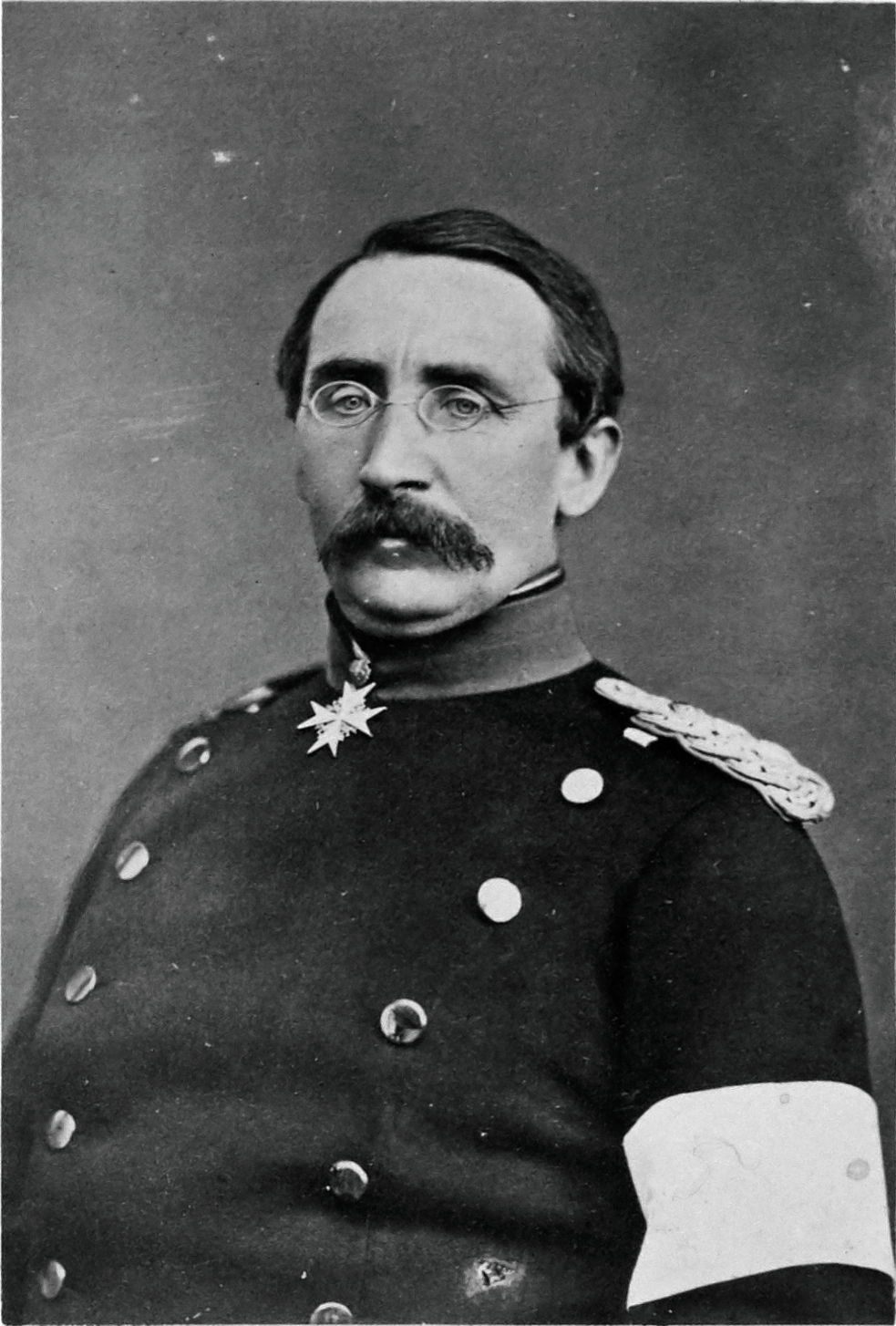
August Karl von Goeben

== The battle ==
The battle began on the morning of 27 November 1870 when the Prussian VIII Corps began an artillery bombardment of the French positions. Fighting quickly spread along the entire line.

On the Prussian left wing, the VIII Corps under Goeben advanced to attack the French center and right. In the center around Boves, the main body of the Prussian 15th Division under General Ferdinand von Kummer advanced between the Celle and the Noye, moving its advance guard forward directly from a line stretching from west of Ailly-sur-Noye to Dommartin to the line Fouencamps–Sains-en-Amiénois on the left bank of the Noye. The Prussians appeared around 10:00 in three columns between Boves and Gentelles. The Prussian 9th Hussar Regiment charged a French artillery battery manned by marine volunteers. The Hussars cut the French defenders to pieces but themselves suffered heavy losses, including the death of Prince Hatzfeld. The Prussians cleared Gentelles and Cachy of French troops. Lecointe then regrouped part of his 1st Brigade for a counterattack, which retook first Cachy and then Gentelles and chased the Prussians back to the woods at Domart-sur-la-Luce, where the French stopped.

On the French right, the French 2nd Chasseur Battalion conducted a reconnaissance in front of Dury around 08:30, but the Prussians pushed them back. The Prussian 16th Division under General Albert von Barnekow reached the line Rumigny–Plachy-Buyon, then pushed northward along the road that ran through Hébécourt and Dury toward Amiens. At one point, the Prussian forces made the mistake of leaving the Montdidier–Roye road completely unprotected, although the French did not take advantage of the opportunity. After driving the French out of Hébécourt, the Prussians encountered French earthworks about 0.75 miles (1.2 km) south of Dury, including four pieces of heavy artillery placed on the road itself. About 300 yards (274 m) to the left of the road, two companies of the Prussian 70th Regiment pushed into a small cemetery surrounded by a hedge right under the French artillery battery and a string of French rifle pits on either side of it. The Prussians found little cover in the cemetery — only headstones provided any, and most of the graves were marked with iron crosses rather than headstones — but held out under heavy French fire for over two hours. Meanwhile, Prussian artillery supporting the attack moved up toward Dury and unlimbered at a range of only 1,200 yards (1,097 m) from the French defenses. Despite losing five officers and half their horses killed, the Prussian artillerymen held their position rather than pull back to a safer range of 2,000 yards (1,829 m), and it was the Prussian artillery fire than ultimately forced the French to abandon their earthworks and fall back on Dury. Prussian infantry including the 33rd Regiment pursued the retreating French troops and occupied Dury and Saint-Fuscien without further resistance by the French. The 15th Division concentrated its 29th Brigade (under General Bock) in front of Moreuil, while the 16th Division's 31st Brigade under Neidhardt von Gneisenau deployed near Ailly-sur-Noye, with its left wing concentrated near Essertaux.

The fall of Dury and Saint-Fuscien turned the flank of the French center at Boves. Colonel François Pittié led a French counterattack along the Avre and at Saint-Fuscien in attempt to restore the flank, but was pushed back on Boves, where he resisted Prussian assaults for a time. Later in the day, the Prussian 33rd Regiment moved into a ravine between Boves and Saint-Nicolas and launched an assault from it against French artillery positions and Boves itself, supported by a battery of Prussian artillery firing at a range of 2,000 yards (1,829 m) from a position about 0.25 miles (0.4 km) in front of the farm at Cambos. Although the French put up a determined defense, the Prussian artillery was stronger than that of the French and the 33rd Regiment captured both the artillery positions and Boves after about a half an hour of fighting, taking about 300 prisoners. Pittié then fell back on Longueau. The Prussian 30th Brigade on the right bank of the Avre in St. Nicolas and on the left bank at Boves continued to advance toward Longueau and, in cooperation with the 29th Brigade that followed it, was able to drive the French from the Ruinberg near Longueau, but a decisive final French charge led by a Major Zelé halted the Prussian advance at Longueau.

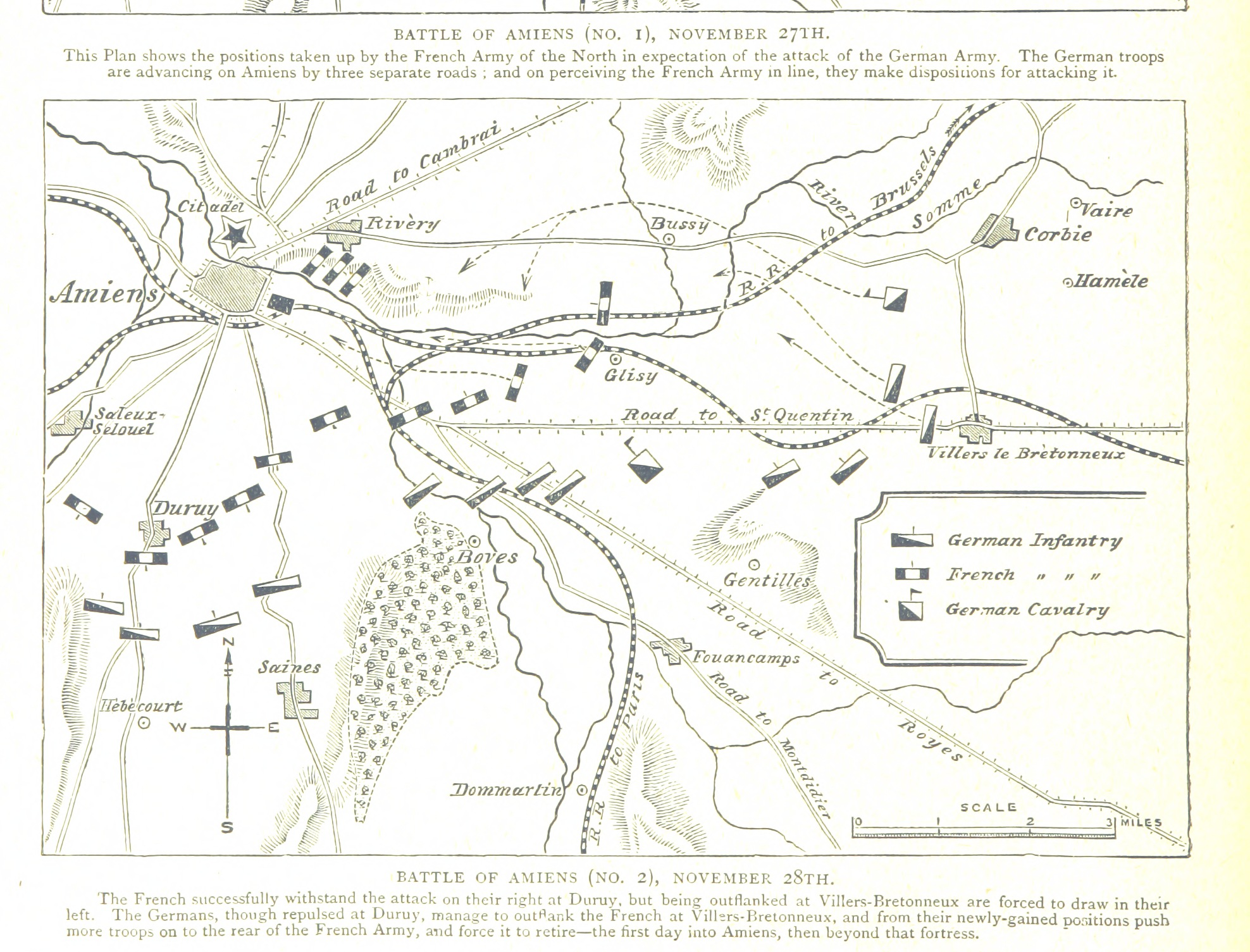
The collapse of the French left at Villers-Bretonneux allowed the Prussians to outflank the French center at Boves and right at Dury (identified as "Duruy").

The main action of the day took place on the French left around Villers-Bretonneux. At 0900 on the Prussian right wing, parts of the Prussian I Corps's 2nd Division under General Georg Ferdinand von Benthei began to advance from the line Le Quesnel–Bouchoir southeast of Villers-Bretonneux toward Amiens. Significant forces the French had deployed in the area of Domart-sur-la-Luce and the Hangard Wood blocked their way. Needing to push north of the Luce, the Prussian advance guard, formed by the 3rd Brigade under Generalmajor Albert von Memerty, occupied the crossings of the Luce at Démuin, Hangard, and Domart-sur-la-Luce. The Prussians quickly cleared the Domart Wood of French troops, and the Prussian infantry then turned against Gentelles, southwest of Villers-Bretonneux. To wait for his artillery to come up to support a further advance, General von Bentheim ordered his troops to stop, and the French withdrew from the developing firefight at Gentelles. In the meantime, the Prussian 44th Infantry Regiment penetrated the eastern part of the Hangard Wood and attacked the French position between Villers-Bretonneux and Marcelcave. Unnoticed by the French, Prussian dragoons secured the road to Domart-sur-la-Luce.

The Prussians advanced through the wood that stretched from Villers-Bretonneux to Boves. Emerging from it not long before noon, they opened fire with 18 artillery pieces on French forces massed on the plateau surrounding Villers-Bretonneux, and fighting began to intensify steadily in the area between Villers-Bretonneux and Cachy. At first the French seemed to waver, but then French reinforcements — mostly artillery — arrived from Amiens and stiffened the defense, and at around 1300, the French prepared a counterattack against the Prussian 3rd Brigade. The counterattack pushed the Prussian 4th Infantry Regiment out of the Hangard Wood and back against the heights of Démuin. Running out of ammunition, the Prussians also had to pull out of Gentelles and fall back to Domart-sur-la-Luce. The commander of the Prussian 30th Brigade, General Otto von Strubberg, intervened by driving four battalions of his 28th and 68th Infantry Regiments to the Luce, bringing the temporary Prussian crisis at Gentelles to an end.

Around 1430, two Prussian columns emerging from Marcelcave broke into the far left of the French line and captured the French entrenchments there. The French mounted a counterattack organized by Colonel du Bessol which retook the entrenchments and pushed the Prussians back some 3 kilometres (1.9 mi). The Prussians having withdrawn, the French assumed they had won the day and began to congratulate themselves and focus on reestablishing their positions rather than on continuing the battle at hand. When the Prussians renewed their attack, opening fire on the French from an unexpected direction, they took the French completely by surprise and broke the French line again. Du Bessol launched yet another counterattack, which this time failed, and Du Bessol was wounded. The French troops began to flee, falling back several miles by nightfall. Thirteen batteries of Prussian artillery silenced the French artillery near Villers-Bretonneux. In a determined advance, the Prussians pushed straight into Villers-Bretonneux, which fell to them at 1600. Their arrival caused a panic among the civilian population; tragically, a number of women and children were killed in the crossfire when they ran in between Prussian and French troops, and other women and children drowned in the surrounding marshes while trying to flee the town. The fall of Villers-Bretonneux and disintegration of the French left allowed the Prussians to outflank the French center and right,

At 16:30, with the Army of the North almost out of ammunition and losing ground along its entire line, Farre ordered a general retreat. He ordered his artillery batteries to fall back to Corbie in order to protect the army's line of retreat to the north, instructing the rest of his troops to fall back on Amiens. After arriving at Amiens, Farre held a council of war with his subordinates which came to the conclusion that a further defense of Amiens was impractical given the army's weakness and its loss of Villers-Bretonneux, Boves, and Dury. Farre ordered the Army of the North to abandon Amiens and continue the retreat, withdrawing toward Arras and Doullens. Only at Cachy, where a rear guard fought to protect the Army of the North's withdrawal, did the French resist until late evening. By the time the fighting ended, the French had suffered 1,383 soldiers killed or wounded, and about 1,000 were declared missing. The Prussians lost 76 officers and 1,216 men.

Under the misimpression that he was fighting a large army under Bourbaki's command and that Farre's surviving forces might outnumber his own, (Note: Manteuffel′s view apparently is reflected in contemporary accounts of the battle. For example, Hozier, pp. 158 and 160, credits Farre′s army with a strength of 45,000 men as it retreated from Amiens. More recent estimates credit Farre with far fewer men.) Manteuffel made no attempt to pursue the retreating French into Amiens, and when night fell on 27 November, the Prussians believed the French still held the city.

== The fall of Amiens ==
Early on the morning of 28 November 1870, the Prussians noted that the French positions were strangely quiet and lacked sentries. Prussian patrols went forward and found the French earthworks empty except for abandoned cannons and the bodies of men killed the day before. Goeben came forward and ordered his forces to advance into Amiens from the south via the road through Hébécourt and Dury. The Prussians passed numbers of dead French soldiers and horses as they advanced along the road through the abandoned French defenses and captured the artillery pieces the French had left behind. After Goeben and his troops arrived in Amiens, three battalions of the Prussian 40th Regiment and two batteries of artillery paraded past him in review.

The garrison of the citadel of Amiens — 12 officers and 450 men of the city under the command of a retired French Army officer, Commandant Jean-François Vogel, and armed with rifles and between 22 and 30 pieces of artillery — refused to surrender to the Prussians, even after 50 of the garrison's men deserted. The mayor of Amiens approached Goeben and implored him to persuade Vogel to surrender to avoid damage to the city and deaths among the citadel's garrison, but the citadel replied to the Prussian offer of surrender by opening fire. Two companies of the Prussian 40th Regiment took control of houses near the citadel and returned fire. The shooting continued into the evening of 28 November, when the Prussians decided to bombard the citadel with artillery. At 0300 on 29 November, eight batteries of artillery marched out to take up positions from which to begin the bombardment at daybreak, but Vogel was killed during the predawn hours of 29 November, and when the sun rose on the morning of 29 November the Prussians saw a surrender flag flying from the citadel. The garrison of the citadel capitulated, having lost four killed and 13 wounded, and Amiens finally fell to the Prussians, who rendered full military honors to Vogel's remains. Prussian troops who entered the citadel freed one officer and 12 men of the Prussian 4th Regiment, who the French had captured during the fighting on 27 November and imprisoned there.

== Aftermath ==
The Prussian victory at Amiens ended French hopes that the Army of the North could advance on Beauvais. Farre's disorganized and defeated army took shelter in the fortresses of Arras and Lille. Expecting a Prussian pursuit, entire French regiments remained concealed in the forests near Amiens in the days following the battle, hoping to avoid detection and destruction by advancing Prussian troops, but when they realized that the main body of Manteuffel's army had instead moved off in a different direction, they made their way northeastward to the area within the triangle defined by Arras, Cambrai, and Lille. Although the Prussians had captured Amiens and the fortress of La Fère also fell after the battle, the French success in retreating preserved their forces in northern France, denying the Prussians a decisive victory.

Manteuffel had received orders from Moltke to move against the French forces gathering in Normandy by advancing on Rouen and then on Le Havre. He therefore made no effort to move northeast to pursue Farre after the fall of Amiens. Leaving six battalions of infantry, eight squadrons of cavalry, and three batteries of artillery from the VIII Corps behind at Amiens, he moved southwest toward Rouen, which the Prussians captured without opposition on 5 December 1870.

Meanwhile, Général de division Louis Faidherbe relieved Farre of his provisional command of the Army of the North on 3 December 1870 and arrived at Arras in early December to reorganize the army. Reinforced by the troops who belatedly made their way north after the Battle of Amiens as well as with fresh troops, Faidharbe's army soon grew to a strength of 43,000 men and later reached 50,000. Reorganized into two corps, and ordered to interfere with Manteuffel's advance on Le Havre and to retake Amiens, Faidharbe's army posed a renewed threat to Manteuffel's northern flank. Elements of Faidharbe's army retook Ham and its fortress on 9 December and held them briefly, then began to move toward Amiens. In mid-December 1870 Manteuffel ordered Goeben's VIII Corps back to the Amiens area to guard against an attack there by Faidharbe. Eventually, Faidharbe's advance on Amiens in an attempt to retake the city resulted in the Battle of Hallue northeast of Amiens on 23–24 December 1870.

== Order of battle at Amiens ==
=== French Army of the North ===
Commander-in-Chief: Général de brigade Jean-Joseph Farre

At headquarters:

- Two gendarmerie squadrons
- Two dragoon squadrons de marche
- Two engineering companies
- One train crew detachment

22nd Corps

- 1st Brigade (Colonel Alphonse-Théodore Lecointe)
  - 2nd Chasseur Battalion de marche (Major Giovanelli)
  - Battalion de marche of the 65th Infantry Regiment (Major Enduran)
  - Battalion de marche of the 75th Infantry Regiment (Major Tramond)
  - Battalion de marche of the 91st Infantry Regiment (Lieutenant Colonel Charles Paul de Gislain of Bontin and Major Cottin)
  - 45th Mobile Regiment, Mobiles du Nord, (Lieutenant-Colonel Saint-Martin)
  - Two batteries of artillery
- 2nd Brigade (Colonel Joseph Derroja)
  - 1st Chasseur Battalion (Major Jan)
  - 10th Regiment de marche (Lieutenant Colonel Pittié) (Likely 3 Battalions)
  - 46th Mobile Regiment, Mobiles du Nord (Lieutenant Colonel Galtier)
  - Two batteries of artillery
- 3rd Brigade (Colonel Joseph Arthur Dufaure du Bessol)
  - 20th Chasseur Battalion de marche (Major Hecquet)
  - Unidentified regiment of two line infantry battalions and one naval infantry battalion
  - 47th Mobile Regiment, Mobiles du Nord (Lieutenant Colonel Duhamel)
  - Three batteries of artillery

Various sniper companies were attached to elements of the army.
