= Jean-Louis Borel =

French general (1819–1884)

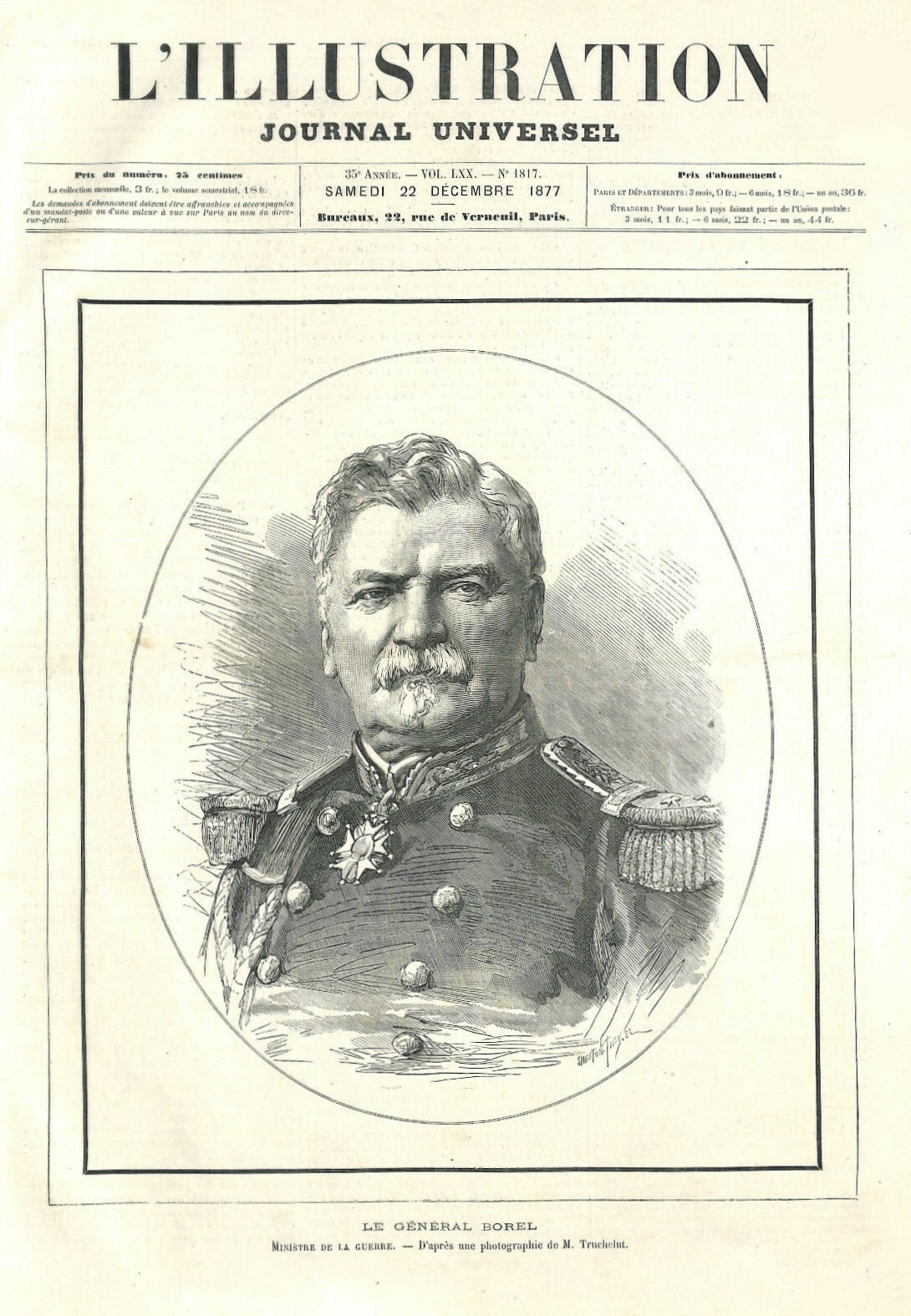
The picture of Jean-Louis's Portrait

Jean-Louis Borel (3 April 1819, Fanjeaux – 20 February 1884, Versailles) was a French general and politician.

He graduated from Saint-Cyr. He was aide de camp to MacMahon, in Algeria and in the Crimean War. He was chief of staff to the National Guard. He was commander of the Army of the Loire.

In December 1877, he joined Jules Armand Dufaure's government as Minister of War. Being more right-wing than the rest of the government, he was replaced after six months.

Political offices
Preceded by Gaëtan de Rochebouët	Minister of War; 13 December 1877 – 16 May 1878	Succeeded by Henri François Xavier Gresley
