= Gaston de Banneville =

French diplomat

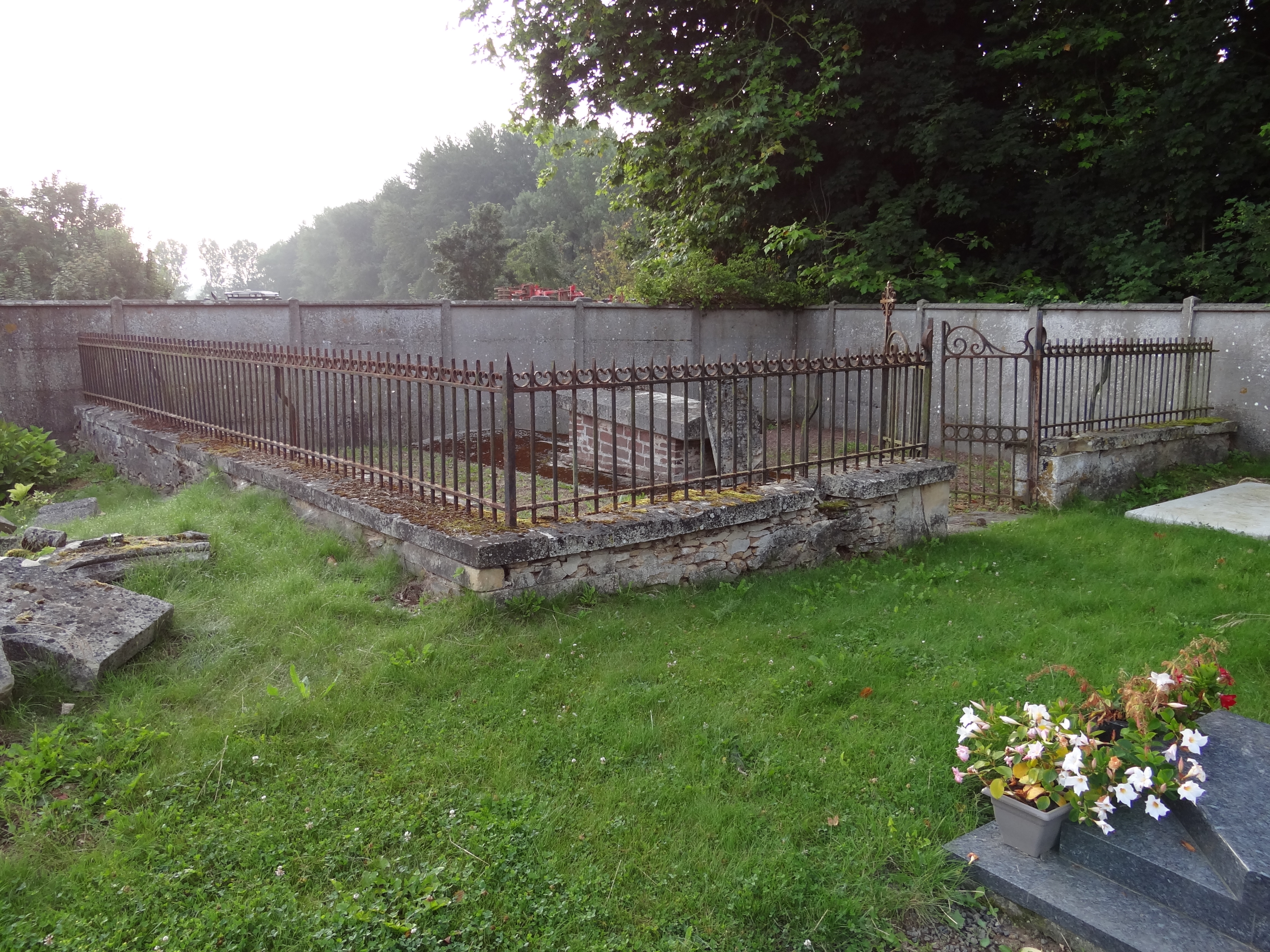
Banneville’s tomb

Gaston Robert Morin de Banneville, Marquis de Banneville (26 April 1818 – 13 June 1881) was a French diplomat and Minister of Foreign Affairs of the nineteenth century. He was appointed to the peace conference to end the Austro-Sardinian War and would sign the Treaty of Zürich as the official French representative. He was ambassador to the Holy See between 1868 and 1871. His term as Foreign Minister lasted just three weeks after prime minister Gaëtan de Rochebouët resigned.

Political offices
Preceded by Louis Decazes	Minister of Foreign Affairs; 1877	Succeeded by William Waddington
