= Siege of Amiens =

Siege of Amiens may refer to:

- Siege of Amiens (1471), between France and Burgundy
- Siege of Amiens (1597), during the Wars of Religion

== See also ==
- Battle of Amiens (disambiguation)
