= François Claude du Barail =

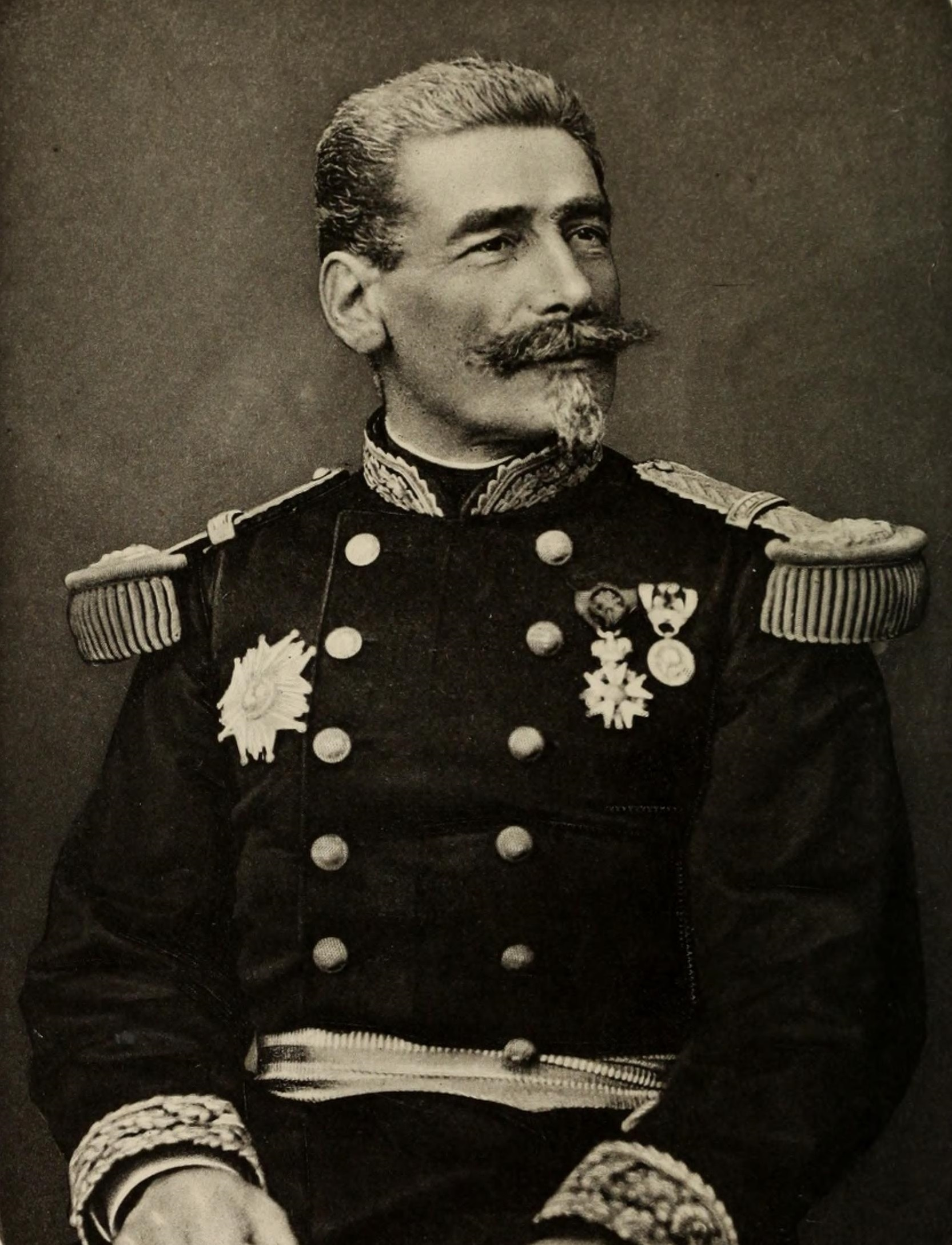
Portrait of Barail

François Claude comte du Barail (French: [fʁɑ̃swa klod kɔ̃t dy baʁaj]; 25 May 1820 – 30 January 1902) was a major general, and French Minister of War under the presidency of Marshal MacMahon.

== Biography ==
Barail was born at Versailles. At nineteen, he enlisted in the Spahis of Oran, and distinguished himself by his bravery at Mostaganem in February 1840. He was mentioned in Army dispatches in 1842, and appointed as lieutenant in the same year. Decorated for his conduct in obtaining the submission of the tribe of Abd al-Qadir, Claude du Barail was promoted after the battle of Isly, where he was wounded, and, after fighting at Laghouat, he was promoted squadron leader in the 5th regiment of Hussars.

The following year, he was promoted lieutenant colonel, and given command of the upper circle of Laghouat, he left for chasseurs to pass the guard. Appointed Colonel of the 1st Regiment Cuirassiers on 30 December 1857, he returned to Africa in 1860, as head of the 3rd Chasseurs and took part, with two squadrons of the regiment, in the French intervention in Mexico in 1862.

During the Franco-Prussian War of 1870–1871, Barail was given command of a cavalry division comprising four regiments of Chasseurs d'Afrique. His conduct earned him the rank of brigadier general on 23 March 1871.

From May 1873 to May 1874, he was War Minister in the government of Albert de Broglie. Drawing on the lessons of the recent war, he reorganised the French Army. During the 16 May 1877 crisis, Barail advocated for a monarchist coup, and became frustrated at MacMahon for not taking a firm enough stance against the republicans.

In 1879, Barail was forced to retire by allies of Léon Gambetta after MacMahon's resignation. He devoted his retirement to writing his memoirs. Barail died in Neuilly-sur-Seine in 1902. Throughout his life, he was an avid Bonapartist.

== Works ==
- "Mes Souvenirs: La Succession de Fleury", La Revue hebdomadaire. N°82. (T.XIX, 3ème livraison). Paris, Plon-Nourit, 16 décembre 1893
- Mes souvenirs, Plon, 1897–1898

Political offices
Preceded by Ernest Courtot de Cissey	Minister of War; 29 May 1873 – 22 May 1874	Succeeded by Ernest Courtot de Cissey
