= Gaëtan de Rochebouët =

French general (1813–1899)

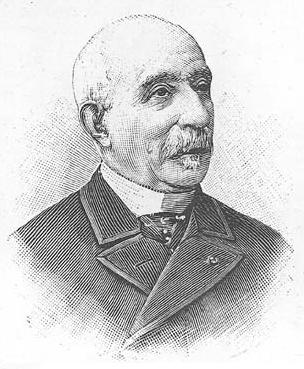

Prime Minister of France
- In office 23 November 1877 – 13 December 1877
- President: Patrice de MacMahon
- Preceded by: Albert, duc de Broglie
- Succeeded by: Jules Dufaure

Personal details
- Born: 16 March 1813 Angers, France
- Died: 23 February 1899 (aged 85) Paris, France
- Party: None

Gaëtan de Grimaudet, comte de Rochebouët (French: [ɡa.etɑ̃ də ʁɔʃbu.ɛ]; 16 March 1813 – 23 February 1899) was a French general who served as Prime Minister for less than a month in late 1877.

On 29 June 1877, Patrice de MacMahon dissolved the Chamber of Deputies after losing a vote on the freedom of the press. The resulting elections of 14 October 1877 were a victory for Republicans, who won a majority of seats. President MacMahon at first attempted to resist the result. He asked General Rochebouët to form a "department of business", with which the House refused to deal: Rochebouët resigned only 20 days after his appointment. MacMahon decided to accept the conditions of Jules Dufaure, forming a new, left of center government.

== Rochebouët's Ministry, 23 November 1877 – 13 December 1877 ==
- Gaëtan de Grimaudet de Rochebouët – President of the Council and Minister of War
- Marquis de Banneville – Minister of Foreign Affairs
- Charles Welche – Minister of the Interior
- François Dutilleul – Minister of Finance
- François Le Pelletier – Minister of Justice
- Albert Roussin – Minister of Marine and Colonies
- Hervé Faye – Minister of Public Instruction, Fine Arts, and Worship
- Michel Graëff – Minister of Public Works
- Jules Ozenne – Minister of Agriculture and Commerce

Political offices
Preceded by Albert, duc de Broglie	Prime Minister of France; 1877	Succeeded by Jules Dufaure
Preceded by Jean Auguste Berthaut	Minister of War; 23 November 1877 – 13 December 1877	Succeeded by Jean-Louis Borel
