= Saint-Quentin-des-Prés =

- Commune
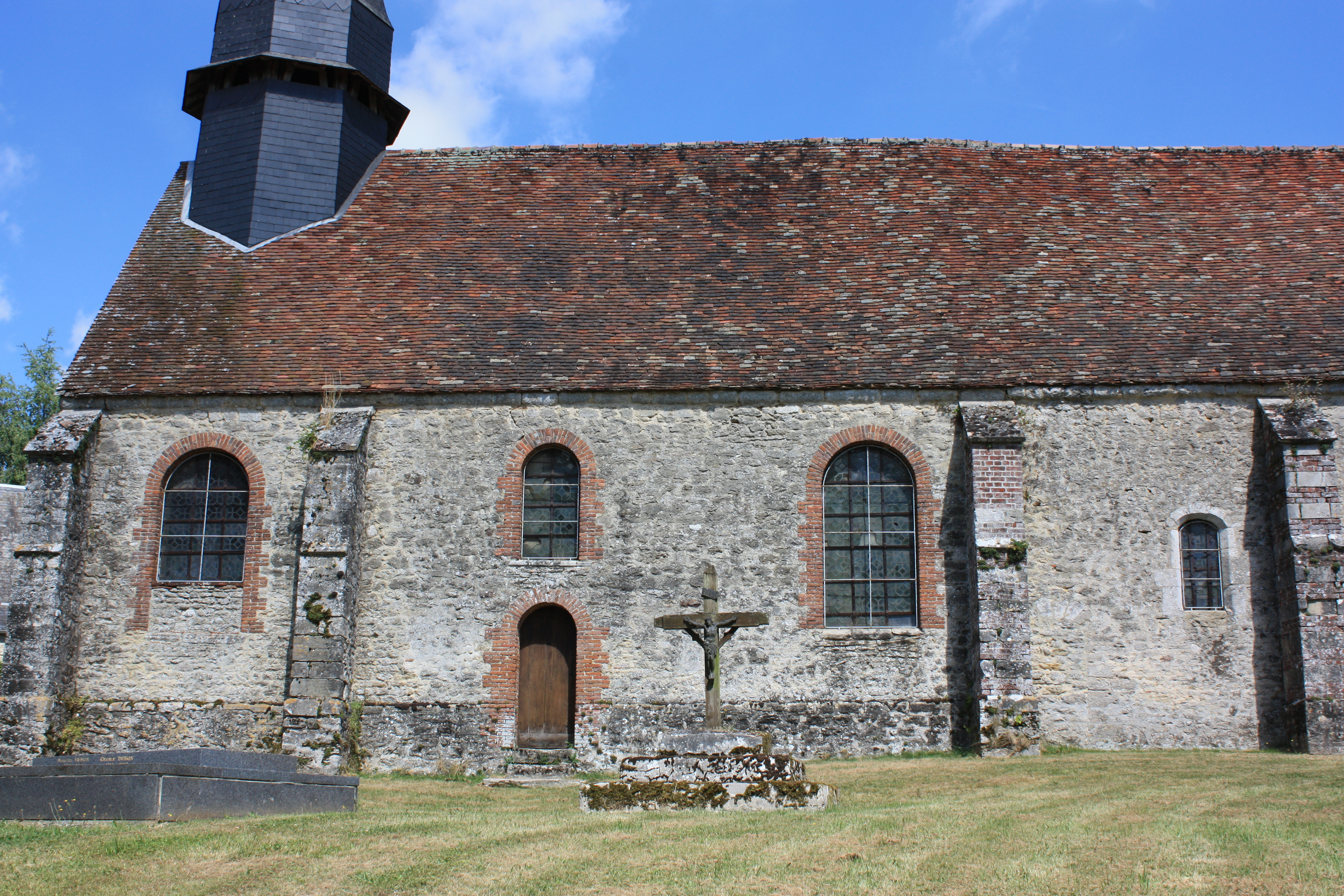
- The church in Saint-Quentin-des-Prés
- Location of Saint-Quentin-des-Prés
- Location within France Location within Hauts-de-France
- Coordinates: 49°31′16″N 1°45′18″E
- Country: France
- Region: Hauts-de-France
- Department: Oise
- Arrondissement: Beauvais
- Canton: Grandvilliers
- Intercommunality: Picardie Verte

Government
  - Mayor (2020–2026): Jean-Pierre Lefèvre
- Area^{1}: 10.8 km^{2} (4.2 sq mi)
- Elevation: 210 m (690 ft)
- Highest elevation: 206 m (676 ft)
- Lowest elevation: 92 m (302 ft)
- Population (2023): 285
  - Density: 26.4/km^{2} (68.3/sq mi)
- Time zone: UTC+01:00 (CET)
  - Summer (DST): UTC+02:00 (CEST)
- INSEE/Postal code: 60594 /60380
- ^{1} French Land Register data, which excludes lakes, ponds, glaciers > 1 km^{2} (0.386 sq mi or 247 acres) and river estuaries.

Saint-Quentin-des-Prés (French pronunciation: [sɛ̃ kɑ̃tɛ̃ de pʁe]) is a commune in the Oise department in northern France.

== See also ==
- Communes of the Oise department
