= Domart-sur-la-Luce =

- Commune
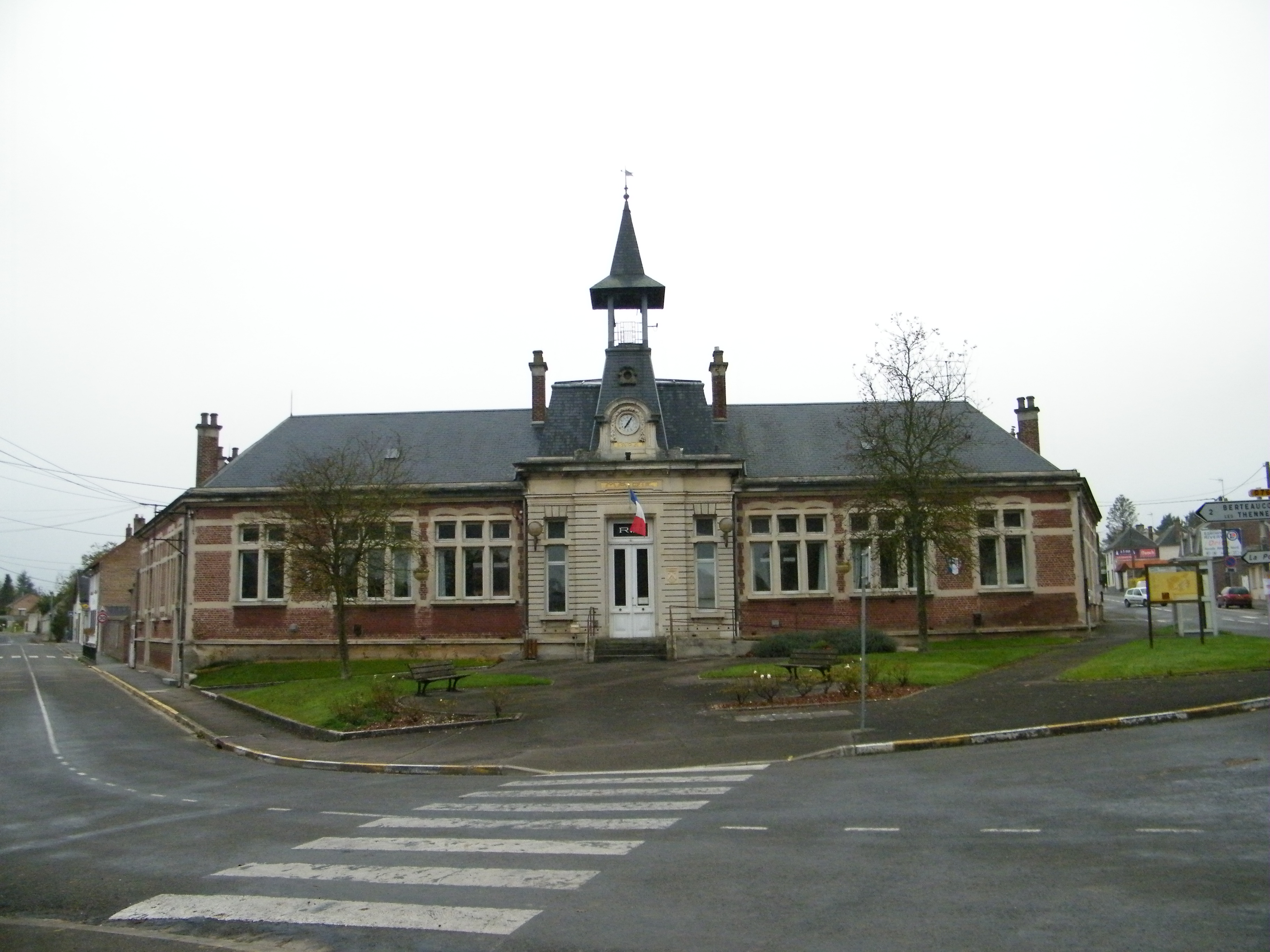
- The town hall in Domart-sur-la-Luce

- Coat of arms
- Location of Domart-sur-la-Luce
- Location within France Location within Hauts-de-France
- Coordinates: 49°49′01″N 2°28′59″E
- Country: France
- Region: Hauts-de-France
- Department: Somme
- Arrondissement: Montdidier
- Canton: Moreuil
- Intercommunality: CC Avre Luce Noye

Government
  - Mayor (2020–2026): Joël Wallet
- Area^{1}: 8.59 km^{2} (3.32 sq mi)
- Elevation: 46 m (151 ft)
- Highest elevation: 104 m (341 ft)
- Lowest elevation: 32 m (105 ft)
- Population (2023): 403
  - Density: 46.9/km^{2} (122/sq mi)
- Time zone: UTC+01:00 (CET)
  - Summer (DST): UTC+02:00 (CEST)
- INSEE/Postal code: 80242 /80110
- ^{1} French Land Register data, which excludes lakes, ponds, glaciers > 1 km^{2} (0.386 sq mi or 247 acres) and river estuaries.

Domart-sur-la-Luce (French pronunciation: [dɔmaʁ syʁ la lys]; Picard: Domart-su-l’Luce) is a commune in the Somme department in Hauts-de-France in northern France.

== Geography ==
The commune is situated on the D934 road, on the banks of the Luce, some 14 miles (23 km) southeast of Amiens.

== Population ==
Historical population
Year	Pop.	±% p.a.
1968	264	—
1975	261	−0.16%
1982	338	+3.76%
1990	375	+1.31%
1999	425	+1.40%
2007	423	−0.06%
2012	433	+0.47%
2017	419	−0.66%
2023	403	−0.65%
Source: INSEE

== History ==
Domart is sited on an old Roman road, known as the ‘chaussée d'Agrippa’ (Agrippa way), named after the general and politician. The road ran between Amiens and Noyon.
Known from writings of 1105, the first seigneur of Domart appears in 1154, called Ibert or Aubert. His château, now all but disappeared, was home to the seigneurs of Domart until the end of the 18th century, as well as to the Princes of Savoy.

At the time of the French Revolution, there were nearly 700 inhabitants of Domart. As with so many villages in this area of France, Domart was practically destroyed during World War I.

== See also ==
- Communes of the Somme department
