= Henri Gresley =

French politician (1819–1890)

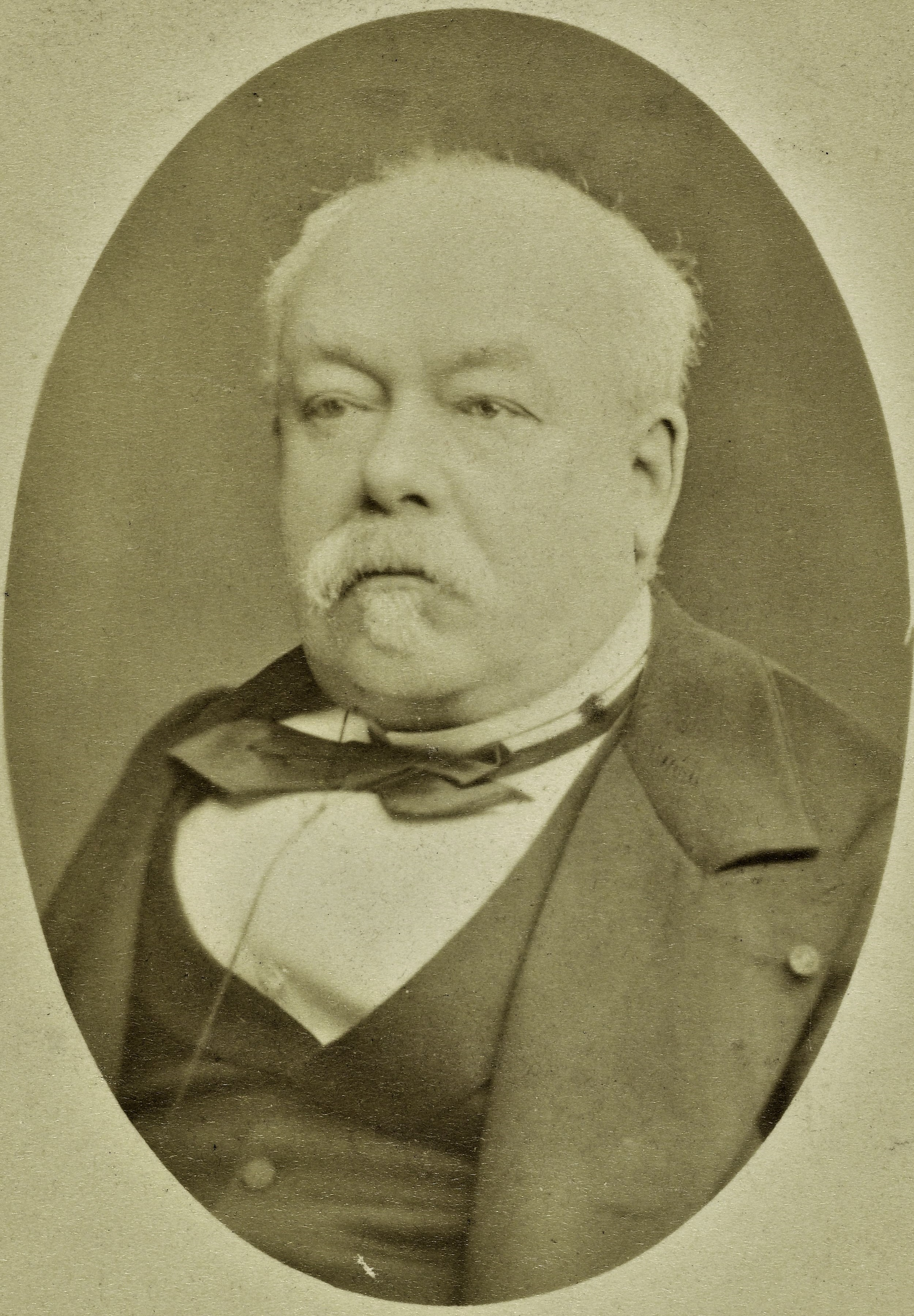
Henri Gresley; photograph by Eugène Appert.

Henri François Xavier Gresley (9 February 1819, Wassy – 2 May 1890, Paris) was a French Minister of War.

In government, Gresley led to MacMahon's resignation as President of the Republic when he asked for the purge of several monarchist generals against MacMahon's wishes.

Political offices
Preceded by Jean-Louis Borel	Minister of War; 16 May 1878 – 28 December 1879	Succeeded by Jean Joseph Frédéric Adolphe Farre
