= Jean-Joseph Farre =

French Army general (1816–1887)

Général de division Jean-Joseph Farre
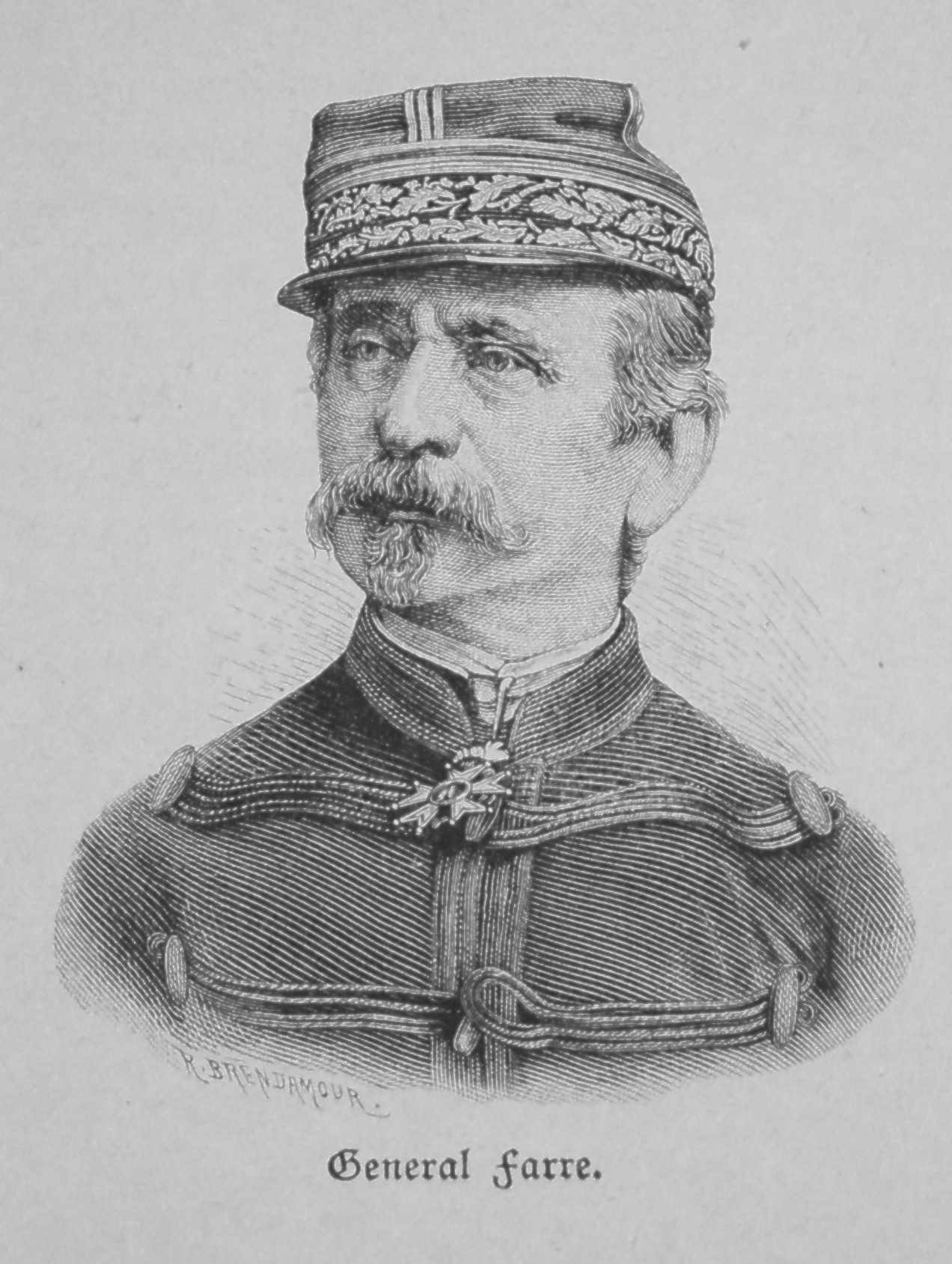

Senator for life
- In office 25 November 1880 – 24 March 1887

Minister of War
- In office 29 December 1879 – 13 November 1881
- Prime Minister: William Waddington; Charles de Freycinet; Jules Ferry
- Preceded by: Henri François Xavier Gresley
- Succeeded by: Jean-Baptiste Campenon

Personal details
- Born: 15 May 1816 Valence, France
- Died: 24 March 1887 (aged 70) Paris, France
- Education: École Polytechnique
- Profession: Soldier
- Awards: Grand Officer of the Legion of Honour

Military service
- Allegiance: Kingdom of France; French Second Republic; Second French Empire; French Third Republic
- Branch/service: French Army
- Years of service: 1837–1887
- Rank: Général de division
- Commands: Army of the North
- Battles/wars: Conquest of Algeria; Franco-Austrian War; Franco-Prussian War; Siege of Metz; Battle of Amiens

Jean-Joseph Frédéric Albert Farre (French: [ʒɑ̃ ʒozɛf fʁedeʁik albɛʁ faʁ]; 15 May 1816, in Valence – 24 March 1887, in Paris) was a French general and statesman. He served during the Franco-Prussian War and later as the French Minister of War.

== Biography ==
=== Early life and career ===
Farre entered the École Polytechnique in 1835, then attended the School of Applied Artillery and Engineering in Metz from 1837 to 1839.

Promoted to capitaine in 1843, Farre served in Algeria from 1853 to 1859. At the end of the Second Italian War of Independence in 1859, he became commander of the engineers of the French occupation forces in the Papal States, serving in that role for five years. He gained the rank of colonel in 1868.

=== Franco-Prussian War ===
A member of the army of Marshal of France François Achille Bazaine at the start of the Franco-Prussian War in 1870, Farre was present in Metz during the Siege of Metz. He was able to escape capture when Metz capitulated and offered his services to the Government of National Defense, which sent him to the north of France to serve as military governor of Lille. Much of the French Army had been destroyed during the fighting in 1870, so Farre set to work forming a new embryo of the army, and was so successful that when Général de division Charles-Denis Bourbaki took command a few days later of what was called the Army of the North, he found that Farre had made fourteen battalions of troops and six artillery batteries ready for service.

On 31 October 1870, Farre was promoted to général de brigade. With Bourbaki's transfer to the Armée de l'Est on 10 November 1870, Farre became provisional commander of the 25,000-strong Army of the North pending the arrival of a more senior officer to take command. Despite the greater experience and much higher strength (45,000 men) of Prussian General Edwin Freiherr von Manteuffel′s army, which was moving up towards Amiens, Farre did not hesitate to block Manteuffel′s path. The Battle of Amiens (also known as the Battle of Villers-Bretonneux) which followed on 27 November 1870 was a defeat for the outmatched Army of the North which led to its withdrawal to the north and the fall of Amiens, which the Prussians occupied on 28 November. Général de division Louis Faidherbe relieved Farre of command of the Army of the North on 3 December 1870.

=== Later military career ===
After the Franco-Prussian War, Farre was called to the superior engineering command in Algeria, where he repaired the damage caused by the Mokrani Revolt of 1871–1872. Promoted in 1875 to major general and appointed a member of the fortifications committee, he was responsible for inspecting the coasts.

=== Political career ===
The memory of Farre′s collaboration with General Faidherbe during the Franco-Prussian War had won Farre the sympathies of the political left of the French Parliament. On several occasions, his name was discussed in connection with ministerial reshuffles. Finally, when the first Freycinet cabinet was formed on 29 December 1879, he was appointed Minister of War. As minister, he reorganized the senior levels of the ministry by dissolving the French General Staff, abolished military chaplains in January 1880, decided on 3 February 1880 that the ranks of territorial officers should be vested in retired officers, and in June 1880 introduced a program to make the military medical service independent. When Charles de Freycinet retired, Farre kept the War portfolio in the reconstituted cabinet created on 23 September 1880 under the chairmanship of Jules Ferry. On 25 November 1880, Farre was appointed senator for life, receiving 138 votes in contrast to 128 votes for Admiral Marie Jules Dupré. He remained Minister of War after becoming a senator.

The administration of the French expedition to conquer Tunisia in 1881 faced sharp criticism in France. To meet the needs of the expedition, Farre as Minister of War initiated a system of reinforcements given the name "small packages," and from the political right to the far left, he was accused of jeopardizing the mobilization capability of the French Army. In January 1881 he tabled in the French Senate a plan for advancement in the military. The Senate asked for certain guarantees and refused the Minister of War the right to appoint the generals, and the Ranking Commission was maintained with the power to select generals. In July 1881, he strongly fought the proposal of Charles-Ange Laisant for a military service period of three years, and made the determination of the length of service return to the commission by a vote of 262 to 172. Certain measures Farre took — for example, the suppression of the use of drums by the French Army — raised protests in military circles and more still among the civilian population. Farre left the ministry on 13 November 1881.

After leaving the Ministry of War, Farre remained active in the Senate. Until his death, he voted with the political left of the Senate, including votes for the law of 30 June 1881 on the right of assembly, for the law of 29 July 1881 on the freedom of the press, for judicial reform, for Alfred Joseph Naquet′s motion to legalize judicial divorce (finally rejected by Parliament), and for budgets for the Tonkin campaign of 1883–1886 and the First Madagascar expedition of 1883–1885. He also took part in discussions concerning the French Army.

Upon reaching the French Army's mandatory retirement age of 65 in 1881, Farre was kept on active duty "without age limit" by decree as a reward for his service during the Franco-Prussian War.

== Honors and awards ==
- Knight of the Legion of Honour (12 June 1856)
- Officer of the Legion of Honour (12 March 1862)
- Commander of the Legion of Honour (31 December 1872)
- Grand Officer of the Legion of Honour (14 July 1880)

Political offices
Preceded by Henri François Xavier Gresley	Minister of War; 29 December 1879 – 13 November 1881	Succeeded by Jean-Baptiste Campenon
