= List of New York City parks relating to World War I =

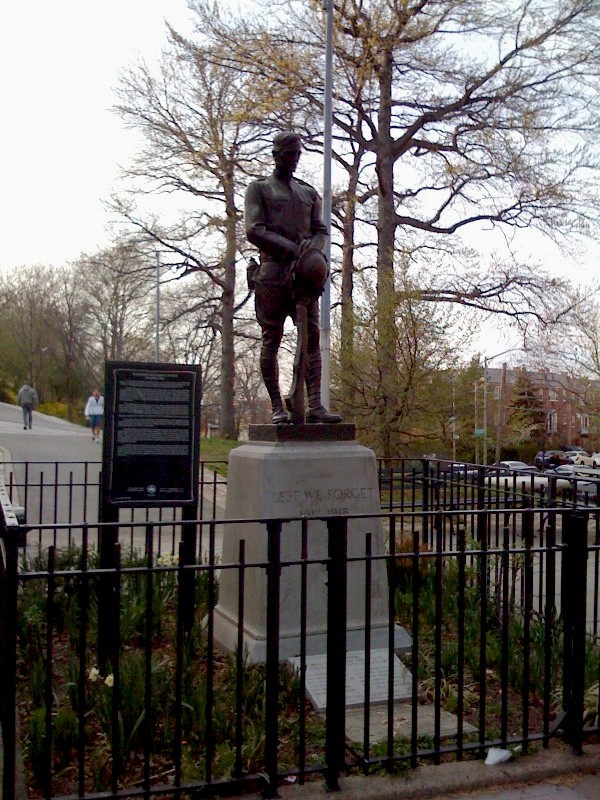
Statue at Doughboy Park, a park with a monument relating to World War I

Within the city-operated parks system of New York City, there are many parks that are either named after individuals who participated in World War I or contain monuments relating to the war. In total, nearly one of every eight monuments within the city-operated parks is a World War One memorial.

== Manhattan ==
- Abingdon Square Park has a memorial
- Central Park has the John Purroy Mitchel Memorial, 107th Infantry Memorial, and 307th Infantry Memorial Grove.
- Coleman Playground
- Donnellan Square
- Dorrance Brooks Square
- 369th Infantry Regiment Memorial
- Chelsea Park Doughboy Statue
- Colonel Young Playground
- Colonel Young Triangle
- Duffy Square
- Finn Square
- Madison Square Park (Eternal Light Flagstaff)
- Maher Circle (site of Hooper Fountain)
- McKenna Square
- William McCray Playground
- Mitchel Square

== The Bronx ==
- Bronx Victory Memorial at Pelham Bay Park
- Brust Park
- D’Auria-Murphy Triangle
- Devanney Triangle
- Graham Triangle
- Hawkins Park
- O’Brien Oval
- O’Neill Triangle
- Owen Dolen Park (memorial)
- Memorial Grove at Van Cortlandt Park
- Woodrow Wilson Triangle
- Sergeant Johnson Triangle
- Vincent Ciccarone Playground
- Wade Triangle
- Woodlawn Heights War Memorial
- Zimmerman Playground

== Queens ==
- Astoria Park Memorial
- Barclay Triangle
- Catholic War Veterans Triangle
- Daniel O’Connell Playground
- Doughboy Park
- Dwyer Square
- Fagan Square
- Flushing Fields
- Foch Sitting Area
- Foothill Malls (Hollis World War Memorial)
- Forest Park (Richmond Hill War Memorial)
- Garlinge Triangle
- Gordon Triangle
- Glendale Veterans Triangle
- Hillcrest Veterans Square
- Howard Von Dohlen Playground
- Kennedy Playground
- Legion Triangle
- Lost Battalion Hall
- Luke J. Lang Square
- Major Mark Park
- MacDonald Park (New York City)|MacDonald Park
- Mall Eighteen
- McConnell Park
- McKenna Triangle
- McKee Triangle
- Norelli-Hargreaves Playground
- Norelli-Hargreaves Triangle
- O'Connell Playground
- Proctor-Hopson Circle
- Queens Village Veterans Plaza
- Ridgewood Veterans Triangle
- Sergeant Colyer Square
- Sohncke Square
- Steinmann Triangle
- Triangle 54 (memorial flagpole)
- Veterans Park (New York City)|Veterans Park (Broad Channel)
- Veterans Square
- Wellbrook Triangle
- Winfield War Memorial
- William F. Moore Park

== Brooklyn ==
- Alben Triangle
- Ascenzi Square
- Beattie Square
- Callahan–Kelly Playground
- Freedom Triangle
- Heisser Triangle
- Highland Park (Dawn of Glory sculpture)
- Ketchum Triangle
- Person Square
- Private Sonsire Triangle
- Saratoga Park War Memorial
- T. Raymond Nulty Square inside McCarren Park
- William E. Sheridan Playground
- Zion Triangle

== Staten Island ==
- Egbert Triangle
- Levy Playground
- Hero Park
- Mahoney Playground
- DeMatti Playground
- Pleasant Plains Memorial
- White Playground
