= Equestrian statue of Ferdinand Foch, London =

Sculpture in Grosvenor Gardens, London

Equestrian statue of Ferdinand Foch
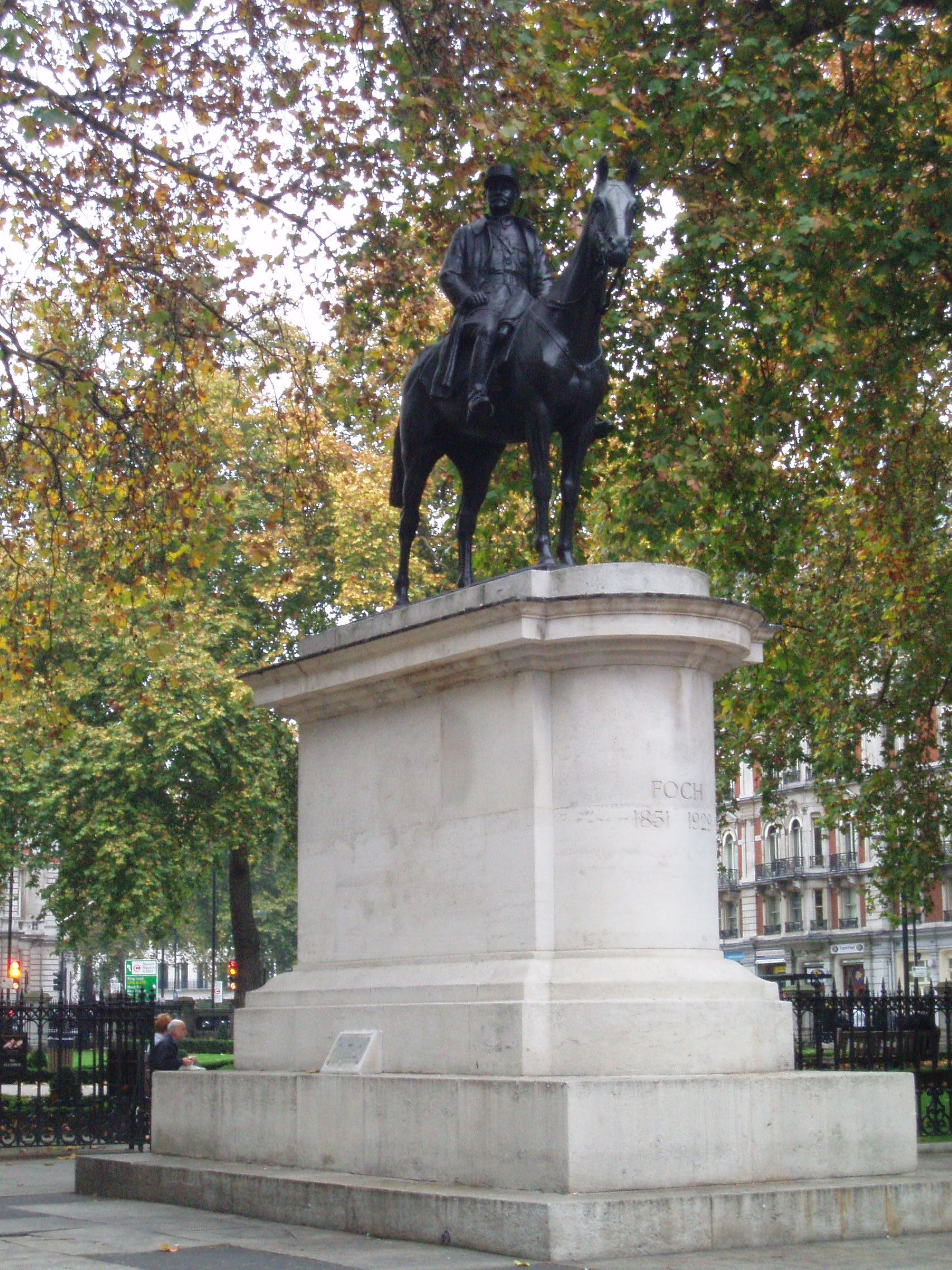
- Artist: Georges Malissard (statue); Paul Lebret (plinth)
- Completion date: 1930
- Type: Sculpture (Equestrian statue)
- Medium: Bronze
- Subject: Ferdinand Foch
- Dimensions: 3.20 m (10.5 ft)
- Location: Grosvenor Gardens, London; 51.4964°N 0.14525°W

Listed Building – Grade II*
- Official name: Statue of Marshal Foch
- Designated: 24 February 1958
- Reference no.: 1066732

The equestrian statue of Ferdinand Foch stands in Lower Grosvenor Gardens, London. The sculptor was Georges Malissard and the statue is a replica of another raised in Cassel, France. Foch, appointed Supreme Commander of the Allied Forces on the Western Front in the Spring of 1918, was widely seen as the architect of Germany's ultimate defeat and surrender in November 1918. Among many other honours, he was made an honorary Field marshal in the British Army, the only French military commander to receive such a distinction. Following Foch's death in March 1929, a campaign was launched to erect a statue in London in his memory. The Foch Memorial Committee chose Malissard as the sculptor, who produced a replica of his 1928 statue of Foch at Cassel. The statue was unveiled by the Prince of Wales on 5 June 1930. Designated a Grade II listed structure in 1958, the statue's status was raised to Grade II* in 2016.

== History ==
Ferdinand Foch (1851–1929) began his military career as an enlisted soldier in the Franco-Prussian War of 1870. Gaining rapid promotion in the First World War, in March 1918 he was appointed Supreme Allied Commander of all the allied forces on the Western Front. The following months saw increasing allied success, and final German defeat, which Foch's great patron, the British Prime Minister David Lloyd George, among others, attributed primarily to Foch's strategic direction. In November 1918, Foch accepted the German surrender and signed the Armistice of 11 November 1918 on behalf of the Allied nations in a railway carriage in the Forest of Compiegne.

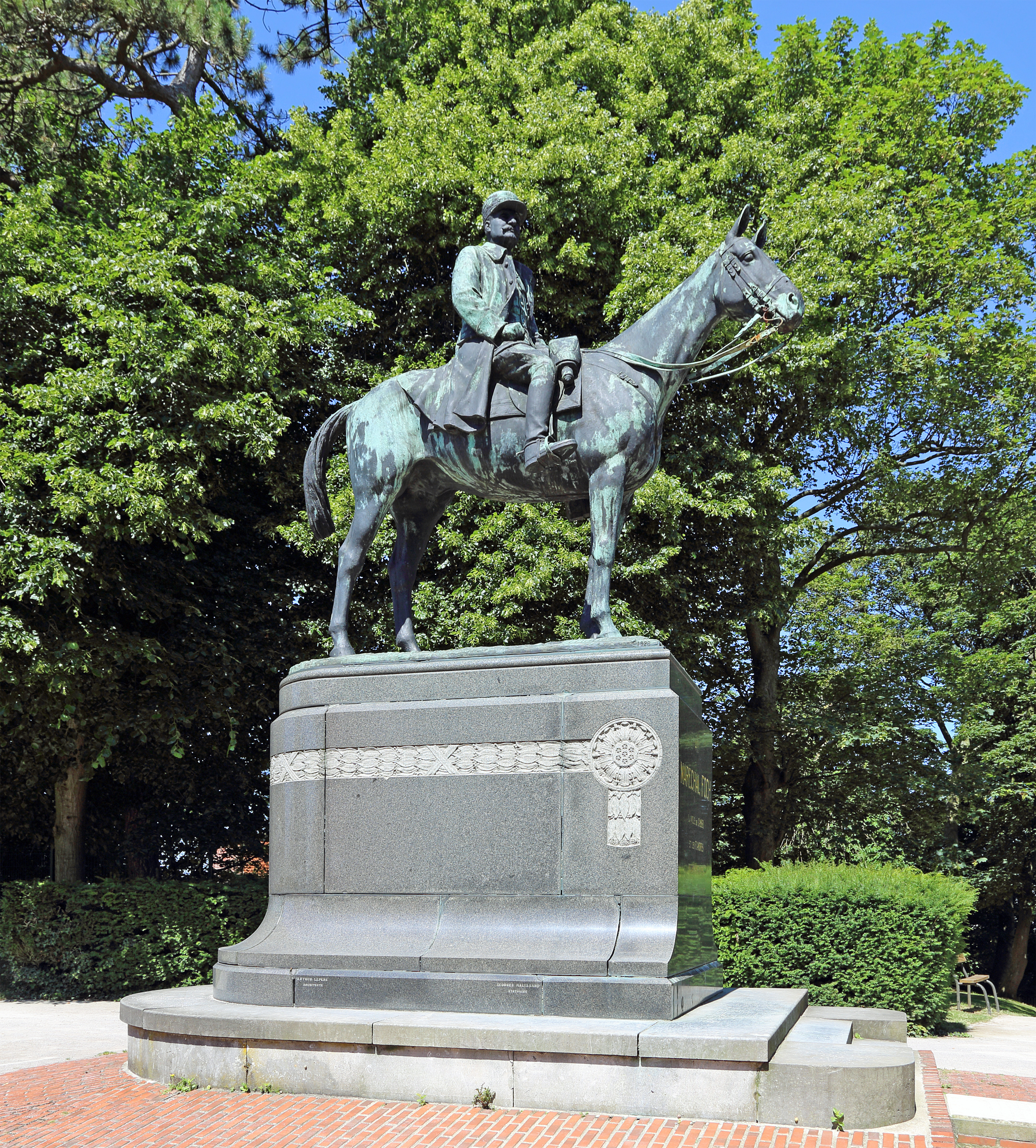
The original statue, in Cassel

Foch was the recipient of many French and foreign honours; among these the British government awarded him the Order of Merit and made him an honorary Field marshal. Following Foch's death in March 1929, the British civil servant, Lord Askwith established the Foch Memorial Committee to plan and fund a permanent memorial. The French sculptor Georges Malissard was approached and agreed to cast a replica of an earlier equestrian statue he had created of Foch in the French town of Cassel. The choice of a copy of a French statue by a French sculptor was not without controversy; the President of the Royal British Society of Sculptors wrote to The Times to complain, and the Chair of the Royal Fine Art Commission, Lord Crawford, privately described the final design as "a very poor and commonplace thing". Nevertheless, the Memorial Committee pressed ahead, partly due to underfunding of the project and the relatively cheap cost of the replica. The final cost of the statue was £5000.

The statue was originally intended to stand at the northern end of Grosvenor Gardens, but Malissard insisted on a more southerly situation as the statue would then be seen by French visitors arriving at Victoria Station, the London terminus for the prestigious cross-channel boat trains. The memorial was unveiled by Edward, Prince of Wales, on 5 June 1930 at a ceremony also attended by Lloyd George, Admiral Lord Jellicoe and an array of British and French senior military officers.

Commemorative ceremonies held at the statue include a rededication in November 2014, and a ceremony held on 26 March 2018 to commemorate the centenary of the appointment of Foch as Supreme Allied Commander on the Western Front.

== Architecture and description ==
The sculpture was designed by Georges Malissard and the plinth by the architect Paul Lebret. The statue is of bronze and is 3.2m high, while the 3.85m high pedestal is of Portland stone. Foch is depicted in service uniform, astride a horse. The plinth has three inscriptions: the front reading "Foch" and giving the dates of his birth and death; the one on the right reading; "I am conscious of having served England as I served my own country"; and that at the back recording Foch's most senior ranks and decorations. The statue's setting was redesigned as a garden in the French style after the Second World War and dedicated to Foch's memory in 1952. The cost was borne by the Government of France. Pevsner records the "dear little shell and pebbledash lodges".

In 1958, the statue was designated a Grade II listed structure, a designation that was raised to Grade II* in 2016. The listing records the statue's historic and sculptural value, as well as its contribution to the overall setting of Grosvenor Gardens.

== Sources ==
- Blackwood, John (1989). London's Immortals: The Complete Outdoor Commemorative Statues. London: Savoy Press. ISBN 0-9514296-0-4. OCLC 21328602.
- Bradley, Simon; Pevsner, Nikolaus (2003). London: Westminster. The Buildings of England. New Haven, US, London, UK: Yale University Press. ISBN 9780300095951. OCLC 609428632.
- Chickering, Roger; Förster, Stig (2000). Great War, Total War: combat and mobilization on the Western Front, 1914–1918. Cambridge, UK: Cambridge University Press. ISBN 0-521-77352-0.
- Darke, Jo (1991). The Monument Guide to England and Wales: A National Portrait in Bronze and Stone. London: MacDonald and Co. OCLC 1008240876.
- Grigg, John (2002). Lloyd George: War Leader 1916–1918. London: Allen Lane. ISBN 978-0-7139-9343-1.
- Haig, Douglas (2006). Sheffield, Gary; Bourne, John (eds.). Douglas Haig: War Diaries and Letters 1914–1918. London: Phoenix. ISBN 0-7538-2075-7.
- Matthews, Peter (2012). London's Statues and Monuments. London: Bloomsbury Publishing. ISBN 9780747811213.
- Ward-Jackson, Philip (2011). Public Sculpture of Historic Westminster. Liverpool, UK: Liverpool University Press. ISBN 9781846316623. OCLC 754168747.
