= Ferdinand Foch =

French general and military theorist (1851–1929)

Généralissime Marshal Ferdinand Foch LH OM GCB DSO
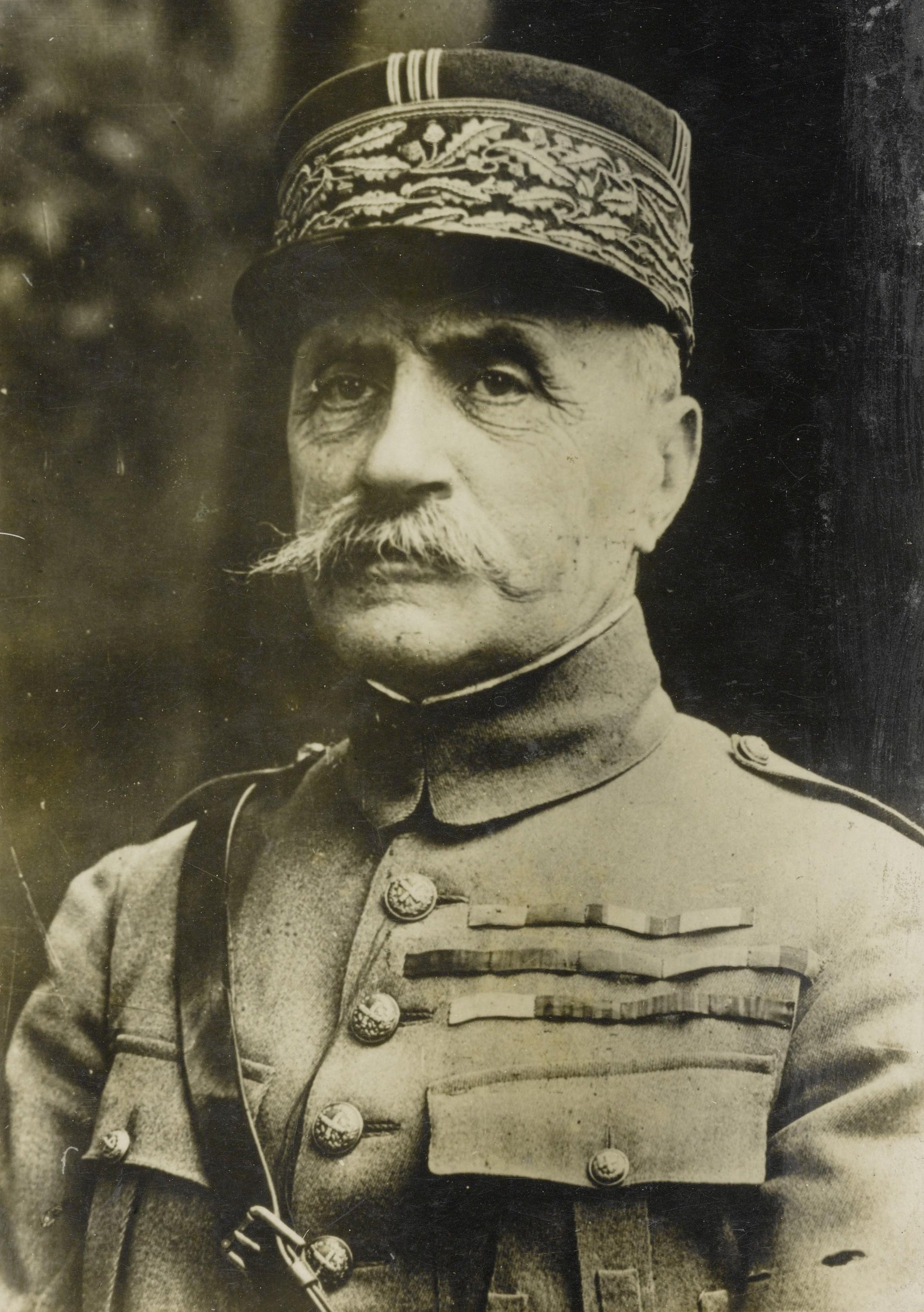
- Foch in c. 1914

Supreme Allied Commander
- In office 26 March 1918 – 10 January 1920
- Preceded by: Office established
- Succeeded by: Office disestablished (Note: The position of Supreme Allied Commander was re-established during the Second World War.)

26th Chief of the Army Staff of France
- In office 16 May 1917 – 29 December 1918
- President: Raymond Poincaré
- Prime Minister: Alexandre Ribot; Paul Painlevé; Georges Clemenceau
- Minister of War: Paul Painlevé; Georges Clemenceau
- Preceded by: Philippe Pétain
- Succeeded by: Henri Alby

1st Commander of the Army Group North
- In office 4 October 1914 – 27 December 1916
- President: Raymond Poincaré
- Minister of War: Alexandre Millerand; Joseph Gallieni; Pierre Roques; Hubert Lyautey
- Chief of Staff: Joseph Joffre; Robert Nivelle
- Preceded by: Military unit created
- Succeeded by: Louis Franchet d'Espèrey

1st Commander of the 9th Army
- In office 29 August 1914 – 5 October 1914
- President: Raymond Poincaré
- Minister of War: Alexandre Millerand
- Chief of Staff: Joseph Joffre
- Preceded by: Military unit created
- Succeeded by: Antoine de Mitry (1918)

8th Commander of the 20th Army Corps
- In office 11 August 1913 – 29 August 1914
- President: Raymond Poincaré
- Minister of War: Eugène Étienne; Joseph Noulens; Théophile Delcassé; Adolphe Messimy; Alexandre Millerand
- Chief of Staff: Joseph Joffre
- Preceded by: Paul Henri Goetschy
- Succeeded by: Maurice Balfourier

Personal details
- Born: 2 October 1851 Tarbes, France
- Died: 20 March 1929 (aged 77) Paris, France
- Resting place: Les Invalides
- Spouse: Julie Bienvenüe
- Children: Anne; Eugène; Germain; Marie
- Parents: Bertrand Foch (father); Marie Dupré (mother)
- Education: École polytechnique

Military service
- Allegiance: Second French Empire; Third French Republic
- Branch/service: French Army: Artillery
- Years of service: 1870–1923 (53 years)
- Rank: Division general (Note: Marshal of France is a dignity and not a rank.)
- Unit: List: 24th Artillery Regiment
- Commands: List: Army Group North; Ninth Army; 20th Army Corps; Moroccan Division Detachment; 35th Artillery Regiment
- Battles/wars: List: Franco-Prussian War; First World War; Battle of the Frontiers; First Battle of the Marne; First Battle of Ypres; Battle of the Somme; First Battle of Artois; German spring offensive; Hundred Days Offensive

Ferdinand Foch LH OM GCB DSO (/fɒʃ/ FOSH, French: [fɛʁdinɑ̃ fɔʃ]; 2 October 1851 – 20 March 1929) was a French general, Marshal of France and a member of the Académie Française and Académie des Sciences. He distinguished himself as Supreme Allied Commander on the Western Front during the First World War in 1918.

A commander during the First Marne, Flanders and Artois campaigns of 1914–1916, Foch became Supreme Allied Commander in late March 1918 in the face of the all-out German spring offensive. He successfully coordinated the French, British and American efforts, deftly handling his strategic reserves. He stopped the German offensive and launched a war-winning counterattack. In November 1918, Marshal Foch accepted the German cessation of hostilities and was present at the Armistice of 11 November 1918.

At the outbreak of war in August 1914, Foch's XX Corps participated in the brief invasion of Germany before retreating in the face of a German counter-attack and successfully blocking the Germans short of Nancy. Ordered west to defend Paris, Foch's prestige soared as a result of the victory at the Marne, for which he was widely credited as a chief protagonist while commanding the French Ninth Army. He was then promoted again to assistant commander-in-chief for the Northern Zone, a role which evolved into command of Army Group North, and in which role he was required to cooperate with the British forces at Ypres and the Somme. At the end of 1916, partly owing to the disappointing results of the latter offensive and partly owing to wartime political rivalries, Foch was transferred to Italy. After being named the commander-in-chief of Western Front with the title Généralissime, Foch was appointed "Commander-in-Chief of the Allied Armies" on 26 March 1918. He played a decisive role in halting a renewed German advance on Paris in the Second Battle of the Marne, after which he was promoted to Marshal of France. Author Larry H. Addington says, "to a large extent the final Allied strategy which won the war on land in Western Europe in 1918 was Foch's alone."

On 11 November 1918, Foch accepted the German request for an armistice. Foch advocated peace terms that would make Germany unable to pose a threat to France ever again. He considered the Treaty of Versailles too lenient on Germany. Winston Churchill attributed this famous but apocryphal quote about the Peace Treaty of Versailles to Foch: "This is not Peace. It is an Armistice for twenty years." Indeed, the next war broke out 20 years later.

== Early life ==
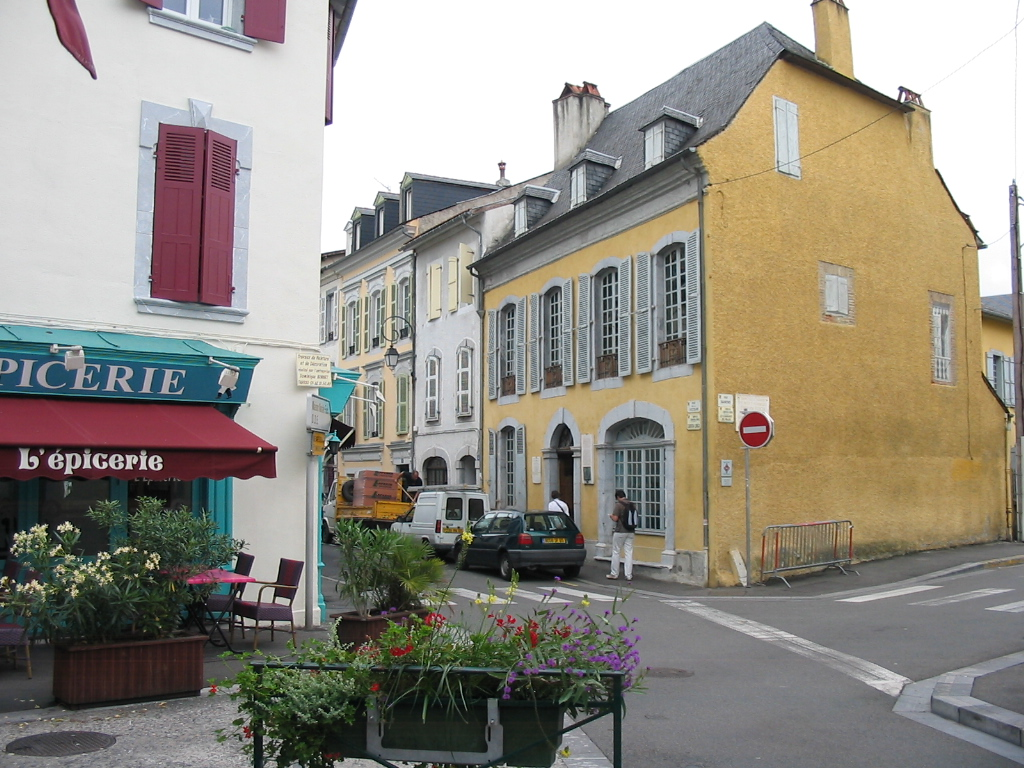
Foch's birthplace in Tarbes

Ferdinand Foch was born in Tarbes, a municipality in the department of Hautes-Pyrénées, in southwestern France, into a modest, devout, middle-class Catholic family. His last name reflects the ancestry of his father, a civil servant from Valentine, a village in Haute-Garonne. From a young age, he loved to study and work, showed great interest in military history and strategy, and was an avid reader of military literature. He attended school in Tarbes, Rodez, Gourdan-Polignan and at the Jesuit Collège Saint-Michel in Saint-Étienne before attending the Jesuit Collège Saint-Clément in Metz. A professor there once said of Foch, "A geometric mind, he is made for the Polytechnique." His brother, Germain Foch, became a Jesuit priest, which may have hindered Foch's rise in the French Army since the Republican government of France was anti-clerical.

When the Franco-Prussian War broke out in 1870, the 19-year-old Foch enlisted in the French 4th Infantry Regiment, which did not take part in combat. He remained in the army after the war. In 1871, he passed the entrance exams to the grandes écoles scientifiques and later entered the École Polytechnique. There, he was an excellent, hard-working, and studious student, and pursued studies in mathematics, engineering, science, history, and literature. He eventually chose the school of artillery. In 1873, he received his commission as an artillery officer and served as a lieutenant in the 24th Artillery Regiment in Tarbes, despite not having completed his course, because there was a shortage of junior officers. In 1876, he attended the cavalry school of Saumur to train as a mounted artillery officer. On 30 September 1878, he became a captain and arrived in Paris on 24 September 1879 as an assistant in the Central Personnel Service Depot of the artillery.

In 1885 Foch undertook a course at the École Supérieure de Guerre where he was later an instructor from 1895 to 1901. He was promoted lieutenant-colonel in 1898, and colonel in 1903. As a colonel he became regimental commander of the 35th Artillery Regiment (35^{e} R.A) at Vannes. Foch was known for his physical strength and his sharp mind who always maintained a highly dignified bearing. Foch was a quiet man, known for saying little and when he did speak, it was a volley of words accompanied by much gesturing of his hands that required some knowledge of him to understand properly. One of Foch's favourite phrases was "Pas de protocole!" as he preferred to be approachable by all officers. Foch's only rigidity was always taking his meals at noon and at 7:30; otherwise, he would work all sorts of irregular hours from dawn until well into the night.

In 1907 Foch was promoted to Général de Brigade, and in the same year, he assumed command of the French War College. He held this position until 1911, the year in which he was appointed Général de Division. Foch influenced General Joseph Joffre (Chief of General Staff, 28 July 1911 – 12 December 1916) when he drafted the French plan of campaign (Plan XVII) in 1913. In 1913 he took command of XX Corps at Nancy, and he had held this appointment for exactly one year when he led XX Corps into battle in August 1914.

== Military thought ==
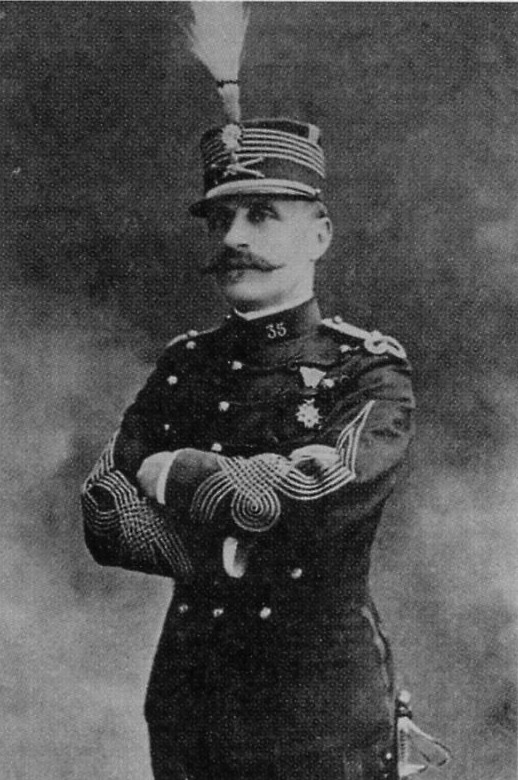
Regimental commander Colonel Foch in his uniform of the 35th Artillery Regiment in 1903

Foch was later acclaimed as "the most original military thinker of his generation". He was a disciple of Napoleon, and made use of the lessons taught by Moltke. He became known for his critical analyses of the Franco-Prussian and Napoleonic campaigns and of their relevance to military operations in the new twentieth century. His re-examination of France's defeat in 1870 was among the first of its kind. At the college, Foch was a professor of military history, strategy, and general tactics while becoming the French theorist on offensive strategies. He also employed mathematical terms in his lectures.

During his time as an instructor, Foch created renewed interest in French military history, inspired confidence in a new class of French officers, and brought about "the intellectual and moral regeneration of the French Army". His thinking on military doctrine was shaped by the Clausewitzian philosophy, then uncommon in France, that "the will to conquer is the first condition of victory." Collections of his lectures, which reintroduced the concept of the offensive to French military theory, were published in the volumes "Des Principes de la Guerre" ("On the Principles of War") in 1903, and "De la Conduite de la Guerre" ("On the Conduct of War") in 1904. Both "thought" and "will" were the key words of these teachings. While Foch advised "qualification and discernment" in military strategy and cautioned that "recklessness in attack could lead to prohibitive losses and ultimate failure", his concepts, distorted and misunderstood by contemporaries, became associated with the extreme offensive doctrines (l'offensive à outrance) of his successors. The cult of the offensive came to dominate military circles, and Foch's reputation was damaged when his books were cited in the development of the disastrous offensives that brought France close to ruin and the army to mutiny in 1917.

Foch was seen as a master of the Napoleonic school of military thought, but he was the only one of the Military College Commandants (Maillard, Langlois, Bonnal) still serving. Their doctrines had been challenged, not only by the German school, but also since about 1911 by a new French school inspired by General Loiseau de Grandmaison, which criticised them as lacking in vigour and offensive spirit and contributing to needless dispersion of force. The French Army fought under the new doctrines, but they failed in the first battles of August 1914, and it remained to be seen whether the Napoleonic doctrine would hold its own, would give way to doctrines evolved during the war, or would incorporate the new moral and technical elements into a new outward form within which the spirit of Napoleon remained unaltered. The war gave an ambiguous answer to these questions, which remains a source of controversy among experts.

== World War I ==
=== 1914 ===
On the outbreak of World War I, Foch was in command of XX Corps, part of the Second Army of General de Castelnau. On 14 August the Corps advanced towards the Sarrebourg–Morhange line, taking heavy casualties in the Battle of the Frontiers. The defeat of the 15th Army Corps (France) to its right forced Foch into retreat. Foch acquitted himself well, covering the withdrawal to Nancy and the Charmes Gap before launching a counter-attack that prevented the Germans from crossing the River Meurthe. During the fighting on the frontiers, Foch's only son Germain was killed in action, though his passing was confirmed only the following February.

Foch was then selected to command the newly formed Ninth Army during the First Battle of the Marne with Maxime Weygand as his chief of staff. Only a week after taking command, with the whole French Army in full retreat, he was forced to fight a series of defensive actions to prevent a German breakthrough. During the advance at the marshes at St.-Gond he is said to have declared: "My centre is yielding. My right is retreating. Situation excellent. I am attacking." These words were seen as a symbol both of Foch's leadership and of French determination to resist the invader at any cost, although there is little evidence that the signal was sent. Accordingly, on 4 October 1914, Foch was made the Assistant Commander-in-Chief of the Northern Zone under Joseph Joffre.

Foch's counterattack was an implementation of the theories he had developed during his staff college days and succeeded in stopping the German advance. Foch received further reinforcements from the Fifth Army and, following another attack on his forces, counter-attacked again on the Marne. The Germans dug in before eventually retreating. On 12 September, Foch regained the Marne at Châlons and liberated the city. The people of Châlons greeted as a hero the man widely believed to have been instrumental in stopping the retreat and stabilising the Allied position. Receiving thanks from the Bishop of Châlons (Joseph-Marie Tissier), Foch piously replied, "non nobis, Domine, non nobis, sed nomini tuo da gloriam" ("Not unto us, o Lord, not unto us, but to Your name give glory", Psalm 115:1).

As assistant Commander-in-Chief with responsibility for co-ordinating the activities of the northern French armies and liaising with the British forces; this was a key appointment as the Race to the Sea was then in progress. General Joseph Joffre, Commander-in-Chief (C-in-C) of the French Army, had also wanted to nominate Foch as his successor "in case of accident", to make sure the job would not be given to Joseph Gallieni, but the French Government would not agree to this. When the Germans attacked on 13 October, they narrowly failed to break through the British and French lines. They tried again at the end of the month during the First Battle of Ypres, this time suffering terrible casualties. Foch had again succeeded in coordinating a defense and winning against the odds.

Field Marshal Sir John French, C-in-C of the British Expeditionary Force (BEF) had described Foch in August 1914 to J. E. B. Seely, a liaison officer, as "the sort of man with whom I know I can get on" and later in February 1915 described him to Lord Selbourne as "the best general in the world". By contrast, Lieutenant General William Robertson, another British officer, thought that Foch was "rather a flat-catcher, a mere professor, and very talkative" (28 September 1915).

On 2 December 1914, King George V appointed him an Honorary Knight Grand Cross of the Order of the Bath.

=== 1915–16 ===
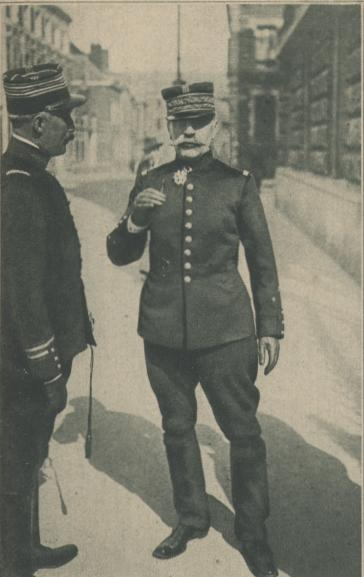
General Foch in 1916

In 1915, his responsibilities by now crystallised in command of the Northern Army Group, he conducted the Artois Offensive and, in 1916, the French effort at the Battle of the Somme. He was strongly criticised for his tactics and the heavy casualties that were suffered by the Allied armies during these battles, and in December 1916 was removed from command by Joffre and sent to command Allied units on the Italian front; Joffre was himself sacked days later.

=== 1917 ===
Just a few months later, after the failure of General Robert Nivelle's offensive, General Philippe Pétain, the hero of Verdun, was appointed Chief of the General Staff; Foch hoped to succeed Pétain in command of Army Group Centre, but this job was instead given to General Fayolle. The following month Pétain was appointed C-in-C in place of Nivelle, and Foch was recalled and promoted to chief of the general staff. Like Pétain, Foch favoured only limited attacks (he had told Lieutenant General Sir Henry Wilson, another British Army officer, that the planned Flanders offensive was "futile, fantastic & dangerous") until the Americans, who had joined the war in April 1917, were able to send large numbers of troops to France.

Outside of the Western Front, Foch opposed British Prime Minister David Lloyd George's plans to send British and French troops to help Italy take Trieste, but was open to the suggestion of sending heavy guns. The Anglo-French leadership agreed in early September to send 100 heavy guns to Italy, 50 of them from the French army on the left of Field Marshal Sir Douglas Haig, C-in-C of the BEF, rather than the 300 which Lloyd George wanted. As the guns reached Italy, Cadorna called off his offensive (21 September).

Until the end of 1916, the French under Joffre had been the dominant allied army; after 1917 this was no longer the case, due to the vast number of casualties France's armies had suffered in the now three and a half-year-old struggle with Germany.

The Supreme War Council was formally established on 7 November 1917, containing the Prime Minister and a Minister from each of the Western Front powers (i.e., excluding Russia), to meet at least once a month. Foch (along with Wilson and Italian general Cadorna) were appointed military representatives, to whom the general staffs of each country were to submit their plans. The French tried to have Foch as representative to increase their control over the Western Front (by contrast, Cadorna was disgraced after the recent Battle of Caporetto) and Wilson, a personal friend of Foch, was deliberately appointed as a rival to General Sir William Robertson, the British Chief of the Imperial General Staff, an ally of Haig's, who had lost 250,000 men at the battle of Ypres the same year. Clemenceau was eventually persuaded to appoint Foch's protégé Weygand instead, although many already suspected that Foch would eventually become the Allied Generalissimo.

Late in 1917 Foch would have liked to have seen Haig replaced as C-in-C of the BEF by General Herbert Plumer; however, Haig would remain in command of the BEF for the remainder of the war.

=== 1918 ===
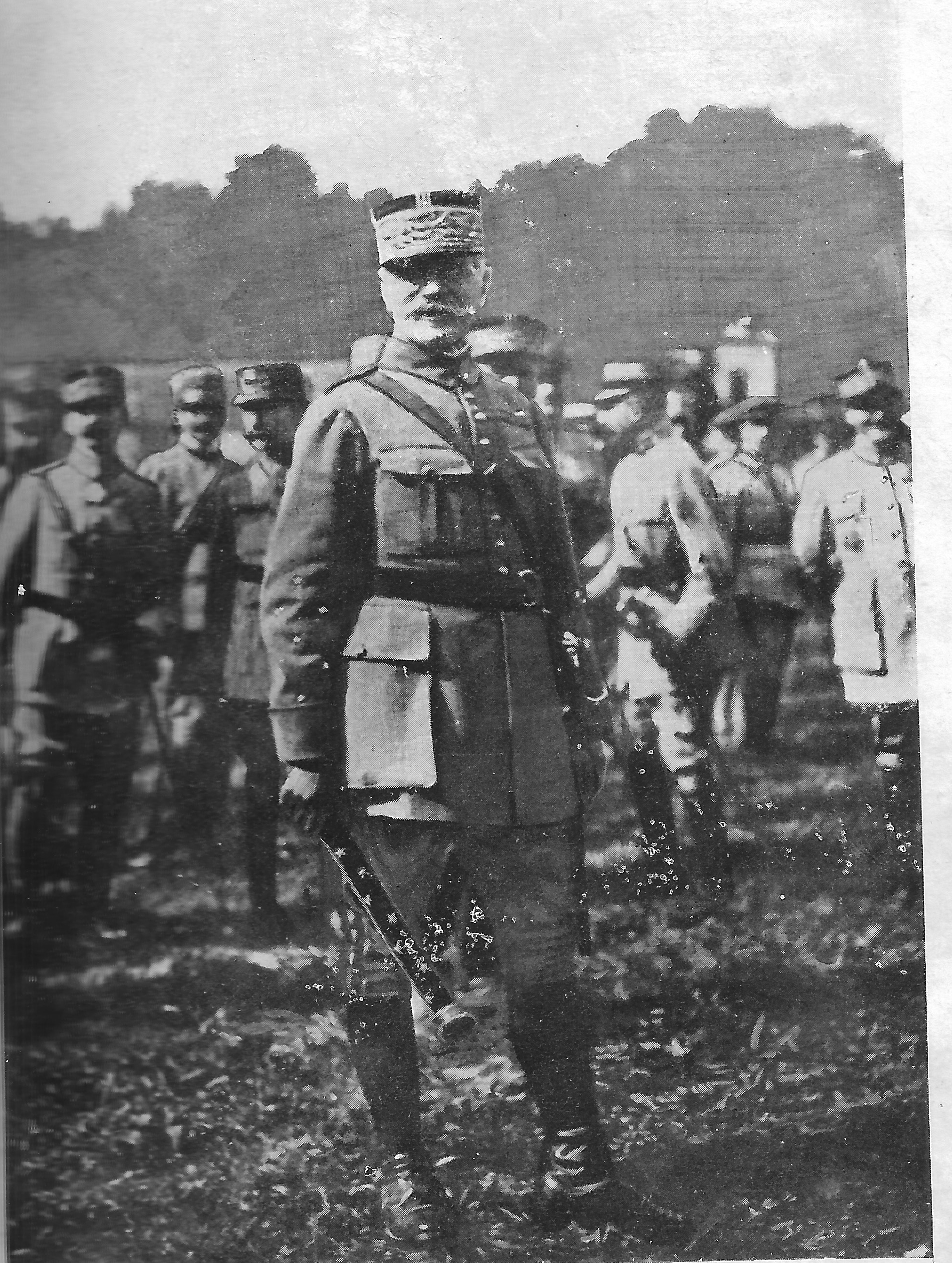
Foch in 1918

In January 1918, in accordance with Lloyd George's wishes, an executive board was set up to control the planned Allied General Reserve, with Clemenceau's agreement being obtained by having Foch on the board rather than Maxime Weygand. Pétain agreed to release only eight French divisions and made a bilateral agreement with Haig, who was reluctant to release any divisions at all, to assist one another. The situation was worsened by Clemenceau's and Pétain's dislike of Foch. At a Supreme War Council meeting in London (14–15 March), with a German offensive clearly imminent, Foch protested to no avail for the formation of the Allied Reserve.

On the evening of 24 March, after the German spring offensive was threatening to split apart the British and French forces, Foch telegraphed Wilson (who by now had replaced Robertson as Chief of the Imperial General Staff) "asking what [he] thought of situation & we are of one mind that someone must catch a hold or we shall be beaten". Wilson reached France the following lunchtime. Pétain had sent a dozen divisions to plug the gap and it is unclear that a committee would actually have acted any faster during the immediate crisis. At the Doullens Conference (26 March) and at the Beauvais Conference (3 April), Foch was given the job of coordinating the activities of the Allied armies, forming a common reserve and using these divisions to guard the junction of the French and British armies and to plug the potentially fatal gap that would have followed a German breakthrough in the British Fifth Army sector. Two days later, while Foch was writing in his notebook, he allowed an interview to a group of war correspondents. At a later conference he was given the title Supreme Commander of the Allied Armies with the title of Généralissime ("Supreme General"). In May 1918, in the fifth session of the Supreme War Council, Foch was given authority over the Italian Front.

Foch controlled the Military Board of Allied Supply (MBAS), an Allied agency for the coordination of logistical support of the Allied forces. In March 1918 Colonel Charles G. Dawes, the general purchasing agent for the American Expeditionary Forces (AEF) recommended to his commanding general John J. Pershing that a new intergovernmental agency was necessary to coordinate transportation and storage of military supplies in France. Pershing took the recommendation to French Premier Georges Clemenceau. The British were hesitant at first but finally the key players were in agreement and the Board was established in May 1918. It involved coordinating the entirely different supply systems for the American, British, and French armies, as well as the Italian and Belgian armies. It started operation from its base in Paris at the end of June. The president of the board was French general Jean-Marie Charles Payot (1868–1931), assisted by an international staff. Board decisions had to be unanimous, and once made were binding on all of the armies. However each army continued to be responsible for its own logistical system and procedures.

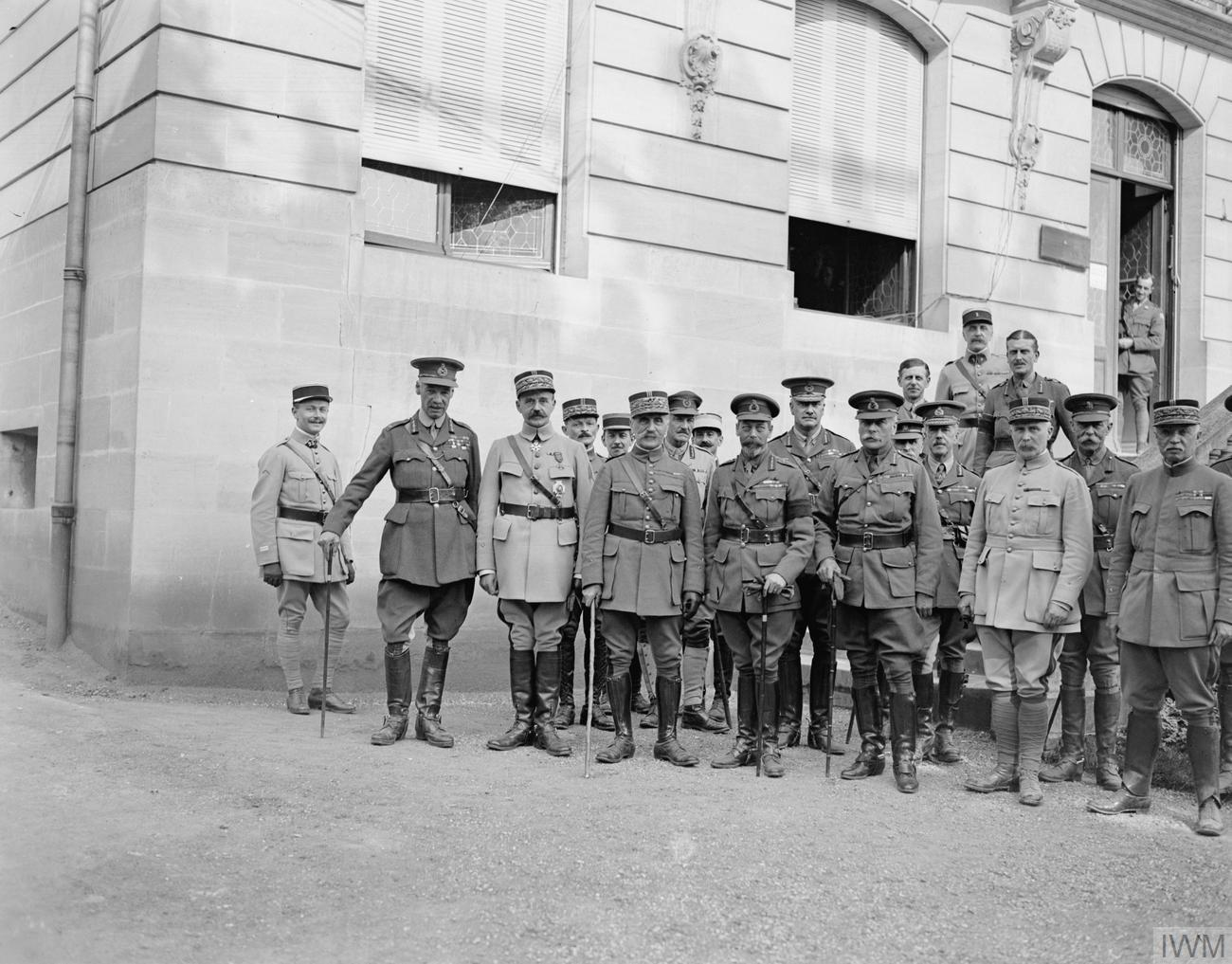
Foch, Weygand, Haig, Pétain and other British and French officers with King George V, 1918

Foch was surprised by the German offensive ("Bluecher") on the Chemin des Dames (27 May). Foch believed it was a diversion to draw Allied reserves away from Flanders. This was partly true, although the planned German Flanders Offensive ("Hagen") never took place. The Allied armies under Foch's command ultimately held the advance of the German forces. The celebrated phrase, "I will fight in front of Paris, I will fight in Paris, I will fight behind Paris", attributed both to Foch and Clemenceau, illustrated the Généralissime's resolve to keep the Allied armies intact, even at the risk of losing the capital. The British general Sir Henry Rawlinson, commanding the British Fourth Army, commented after meeting Foch: "I am overjoyed at his methods and far-sighted strategy. I was in close touch with him in 1916. He is a better man now than he was then, for his fiery enthusiasm has been tempered by adversity." Rawlinson also noted Foch's intense Frenchness: "He knew nothing of Britain. The Rhine was for him a river of life and death."

At the sixth session of the Supreme War Council on 1 June Foch complained that the BEF was still shrinking in size and infuriated Lloyd George by implying that the British government was withholding manpower. At a major Allied conference at Beauvais (7 June) Lord Milner agreed with Clemenceau that Foch should have the power to order all Allied troops as he saw fit, over the protests of Haig who argued that it would reduce his power to safeguard the interests of the British Army.

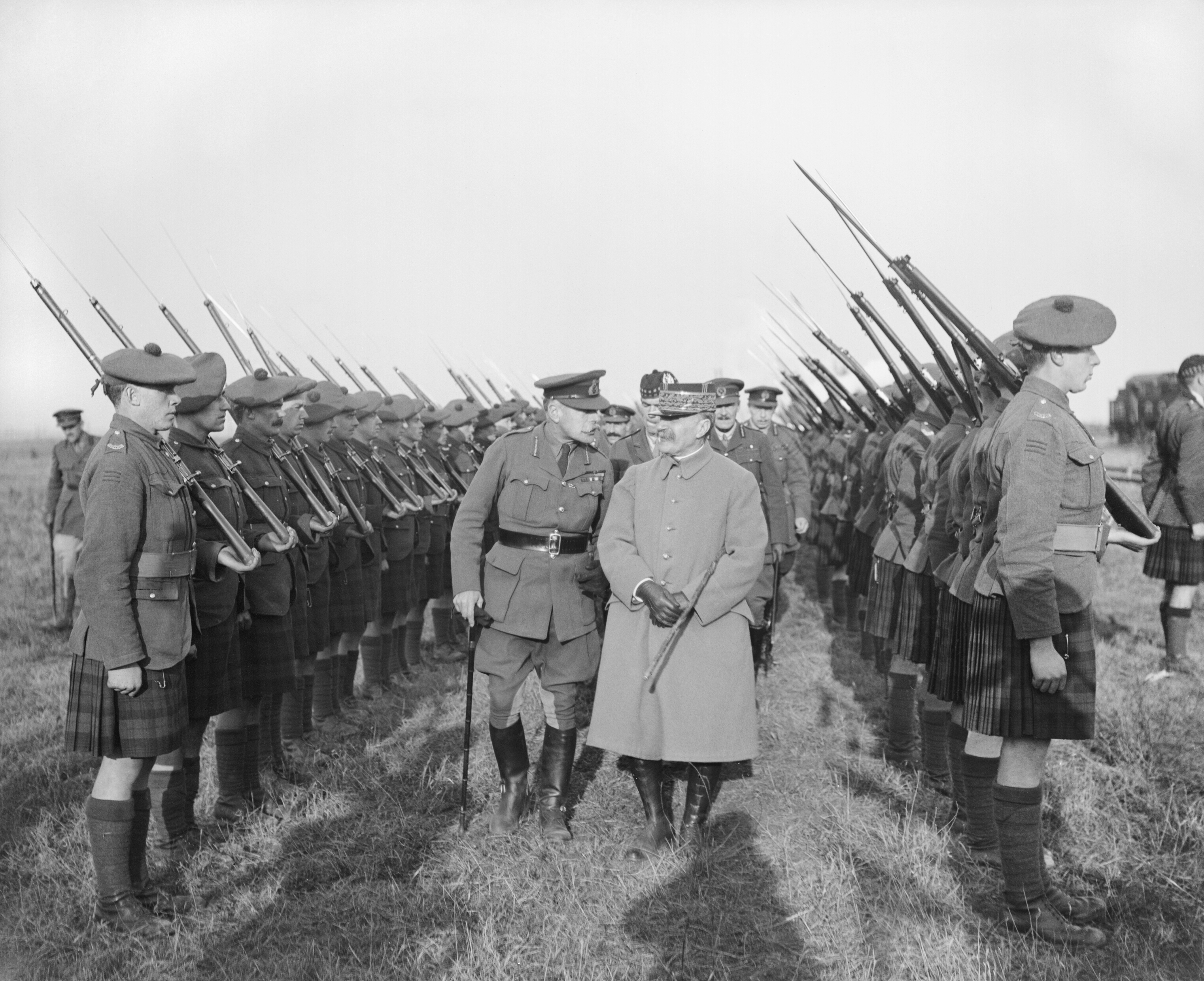
Foch and Douglas Haig inspecting the Gordon Highlanders, 1918

The British were disappointed that Foch operated through his own staff rather than through the Permanent Military Representatives at Versailles, and on 11 July 1918 British ministers resolved to remind Foch that he was an Allied, and not a French, C-in-C. The Allies (mainly French and the growing American forces) counterattacked at the Second Battle of the Marne in July 1918. On 6 August 1918, Foch was made a Marshal of France. Along with the British commander, Field Marshal Sir Douglas Haig, Foch planned the Grand Offensive, opening on 26 September 1918, which led to the defeat of Germany. After the war, he claimed to have defeated Germany by smoking his pipe. An unintended consequence of Foch's appointment was that he sheltered Haig from British political interference.

Before the armistice and after the Armistice of Villa Giusti, Foch controlled all the operations against Germany including a planned invasion from Italy into Bavaria. Foch accepted the German cessation of hostilities in November from the German delegate, Matthias Erzberger, at 5:00 a.m. local time. However, he refused to accede to the German negotiators' immediate request to declare a ceasefire or truce so that there would be no more useless waste of lives among the common soldiers. By not declaring a truce even between the signing of the documents for the Armistice at 5:45 a.m. and its entry into force, "at the eleventh hour of the eleventh day of the eleventh month", about 11,000 additional men on both sides were needlessly wounded or killed due to Foch – far more than usual for a similar time period according to the military statistics.

On the day of the armistice, 11 November 1918, he was elected to the Académie des Sciences. Ten days later, he was unanimously elected to the Académie française. He received many honours and decorations from Allied governments.

== Assessments ==
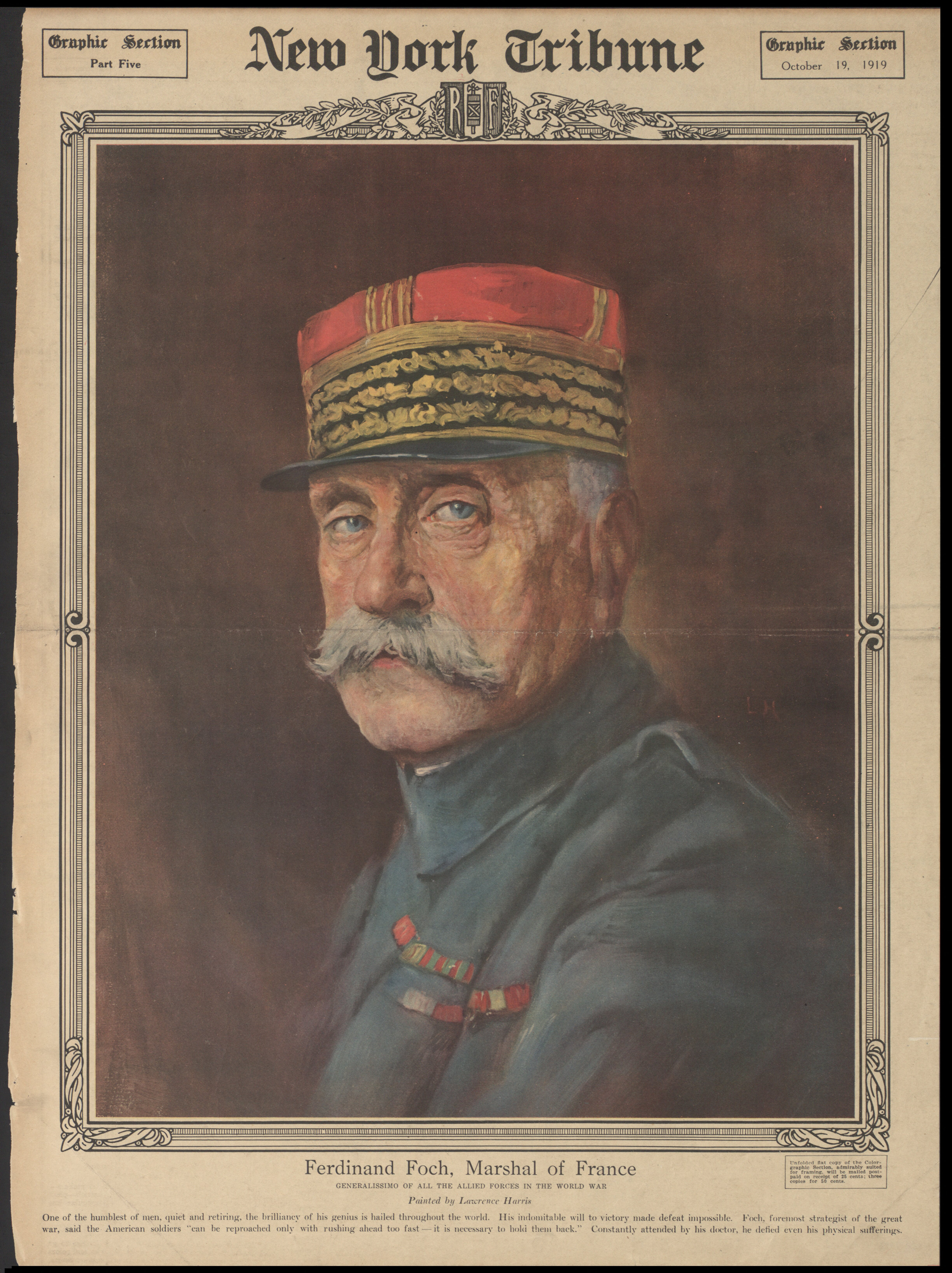
Ferdinand Foch by Lawrence Harris in the New York Tribune, October 19, 1919

In the euphoria of victory Foch was regularly compared to Napoleon and Julius Caesar. However, historians took a less favourable view of Foch's talents as commander, particularly as the idea took root that his military doctrines had set the stage for the futile and costly offensives of 1914 in which French armies suffered devastating losses. Supporters and critics continue to debate Foch's strategy and instincts as a commander, as well as his exact contributions to the Marne "miracle": Foch's counter-attacks at the Marne generally failed, but his sector resisted determined German attacks while holding the pivot on which the neighbouring French and British forces depended in rolling back the German line.

After the reading of the preamble of the November 1918 armistice, Foch left the carriage, in a move that was perceived as humiliating by the defeated Germans. In 1940, after the defeat of France by Germany early in World War II, when France signed an armistice with Germany, Adolf Hitler, in a calculated gesture of disdain to the French delegates, left the carriage, as Foch had done in 1918.

Foch's pre-war contributions as a military theorist and lecturer have also been recognised, and he has been credited as "the most original and subtle mind in the French Army" of the early 20th century.

== Paris Peace Conference ==
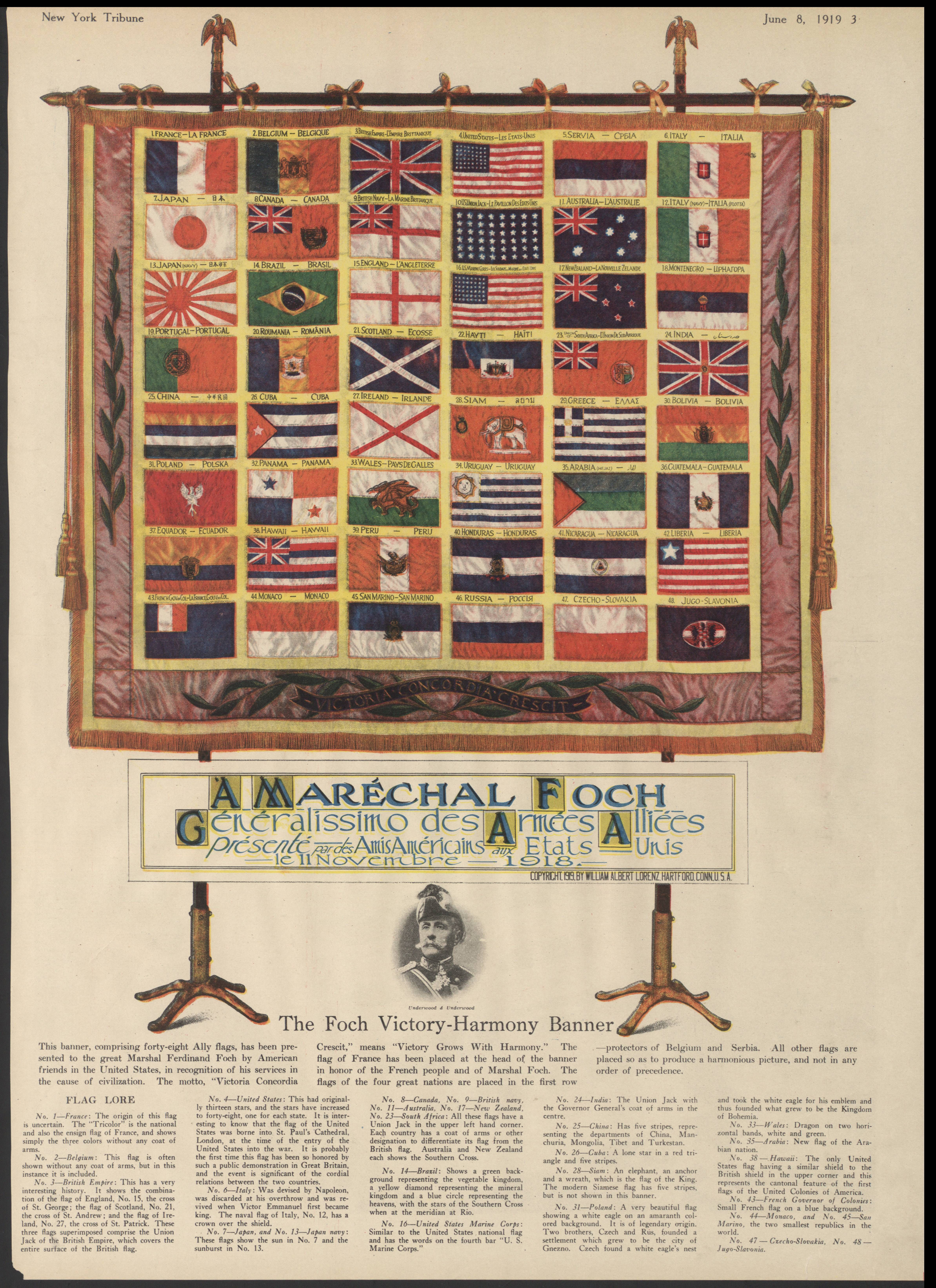
The banner of forty-eight Ally flags that has been presented to Foch in recognition of his services in 1919

In January 1919, at the Paris Peace Conference Foch presented a memorandum to the Allied plenipotentiaries in which he stated:

Henceforward the Rhine ought to be the Western military frontier of the German countries. Henceforward Germany ought to be deprived of all entrance and assembling ground, that is, of all territorial sovereignty on the left bank of the river, that is, of all facilities for invading quickly, as in 1914, Belgium, Luxembourg, for reaching the coast of the North Sea and threatening the United Kingdom, for outflanking the natural defences of France, the Rhine, Meuse, conquering the Northern Provinces and entering the Parisian area.

In a subsequent memorandum, Foch argued that the Allies should take full advantage of their victory by permanently weakening German power in order to prevent her from threatening France again:

What the people of Germany fear the most is a renewal of hostilities since, this time, Germany would be the field of battle and the scene of the consequent devastation. This makes it impossible for the yet unstable German Government to reject any demand on our part if it is clearly formulated. The Entente, in its present favourable military situation, can obtain acceptance of any peace conditions it may put forward provided that they are presented without much delay. All it has to do is to decide what they shall be.

Upon returning home. Foch wrote in his diary:

Watch out: suspect peace, English peace... We must have a program, a tactic, a will. We find ourselves in the presence of an England that has all it wants for the present: the German colonies and the German fleet. We lack future security because [Britain] is not interested. In the presence of an America which seeks its own peace, we must have what we need... It is on the Rhine and nowhere else that we shall find it.

He later wrote:

In a word, the occupation is a lever that we have in our hand and with which we can call the tune.

However, the British Prime Minister David Lloyd George and the American President Woodrow Wilson objected to the detachment of the Rhineland from Germany so that the balance of power would not be too much in favour of France, but agreed to Allied military occupation for fifteen years, which Foch thought insufficient to protect France.

Foch considered the Treaty of Versailles to be "a capitulation, a treason" because he believed that only permanent occupation of the Rhineland would grant France sufficient security against a revival of German aggression. It is claimed that Foch said: "This is not peace. It is an armistice for 20 years".

== Post-war career and legacy ==
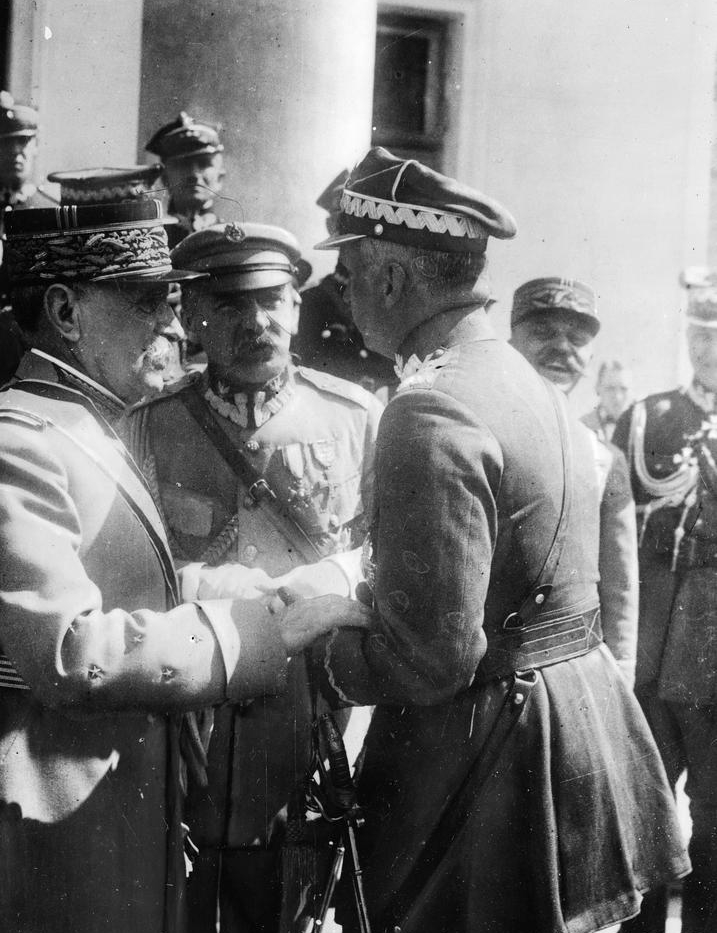
Foch and General Kazimierz Sosnkowski at Belweder Palace in Warsaw (1923). Marshal of Poland Józef Piłsudski is in the center.

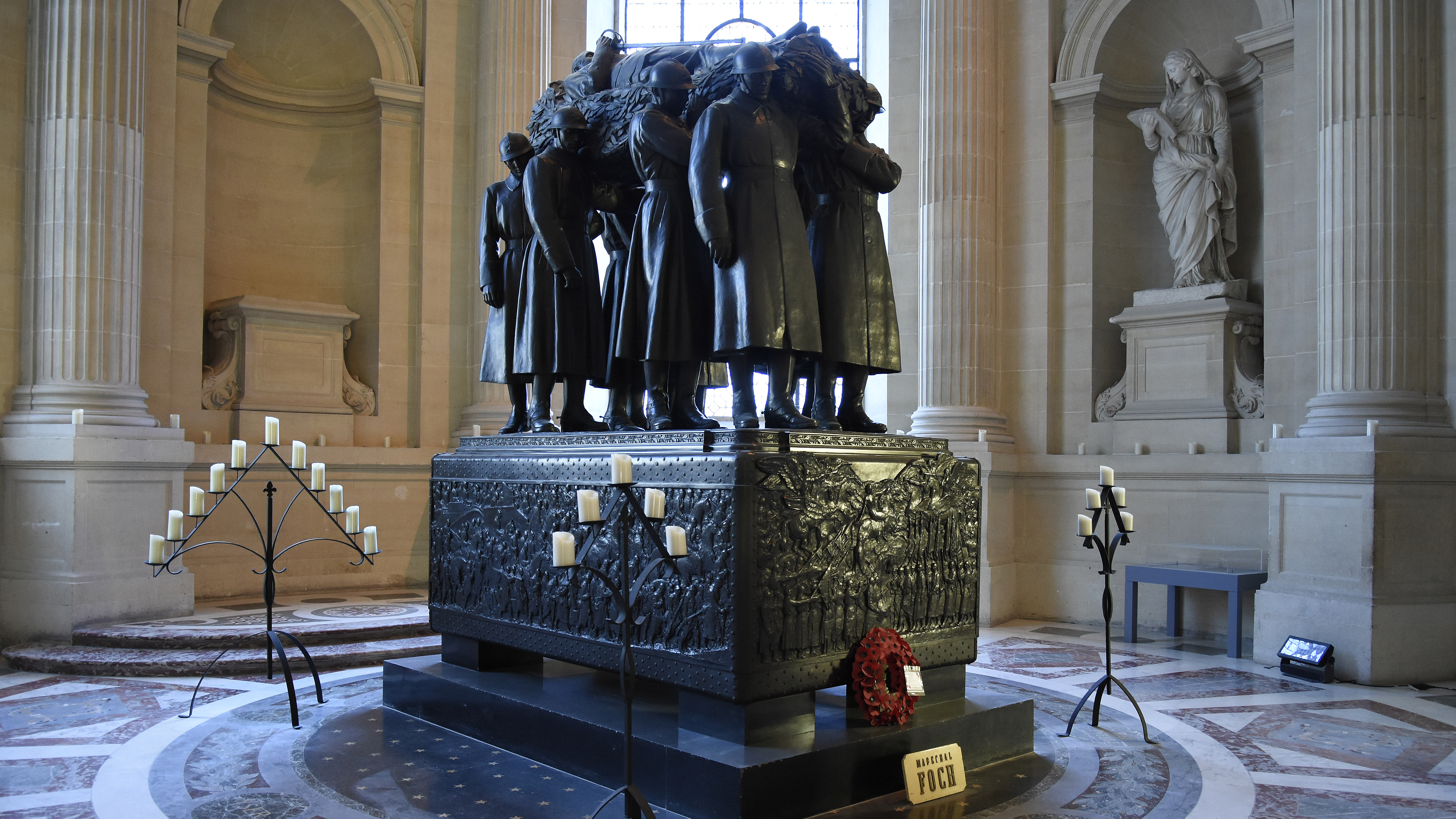
Foch's tomb, Hôtel des Invalides

Foch was made a British field marshal in 1919, and, for his advice during the Polish–Soviet War of 1920, as well as his pressure on Germany during the Greater Poland Uprising, he was awarded the title of Marshal of Poland in 1923.

On 1 November 1921 Foch was in Kansas City, Missouri, to take part in the groundbreaking ceremony for the Liberty Memorial that was being constructed there. Also present that day were Lieutenant General Baron Jacques of Belgium, Admiral David Beatty of Great Britain, General Armando Diaz of Italy and General John J. Pershing of the United States. One of the main speakers was Vice President Calvin Coolidge of the United States. The local veteran chosen to present flags to the commanders was a Kansas City haberdasher, Harry S. Truman, who would later serve as 33rd President of the United States from 1945 to 1953. In 1935, bas-reliefs of Foch, Jacques, Diaz and Pershing by sculptor Walker Hancock were added to the memorial.

Foch made a 3,000-mile (5,000 km) circuit through the American Midwest and industrial cities such as Pittsburgh and then on to Washington, D.C., which included ceremonies at Arlington National Cemetery for what was then called Armistice Day. During the tour, he received numerous honorary degrees from American Universities.

In 1923, Foch retired from the French Army, having served a total of 53 years in uniform. His career began as the Lebel Model 1886 rifle had just entered service, and ended after Foch had commanded hundreds of thousands of soldiers in World War I.

Foch died of a heart attack, influenza, and pneumonia in Paris on 20 March 1929 at the age of 77. He was buried in Les Invalides, next to Napoleon and other famous French soldiers and officers. Initially he was interred in the crypt of the Saint-Louis Church, or Caveau des Gouverneurs. In 1937 his remains were transferred to a monumental tomb sculpted by Paul Landowski, with inspiration from the 15th-century tomb of Philippe Pot, at the center of the Dome Church's northeastern chapel (Chapelle Saint-Ambroise).

A statue of Foch was set up at the Compiègne Armistice site when the area was converted into a national memorial. This statue was the one item left undisturbed by the Germans following their defeat of France in June 1940. Following the signing of France's surrender on 21 June, the Germans ravaged the area surrounding the railway car in which both the 1918 and 1940 surrenders had taken place. The statue was left standing, to view nothing but a wasteland. The Armistice site was restored by German prisoner-of-war labour following the Second World War, with its memorials and monuments either restored or reassembled.

In the 2022 film All Quiet on the Western Front, Foch is portrayed by Thibault de Montalembert.

== Military ranks ==
Private	Student	Artillery student	Second lieutenant	Lieutenant	Captain
24 January 1871	1 November 1871	10 January 1873	16 October 1874	1 October 1875	30 September 1878
Squadron chief	Lieutenant colonel	Colonel	Brigadier general	Divisional general	Marshal of France
27 February 1891	10 July 1898	12 July 1903	20 June 1907	21 September 1911	6 August 1918

== Honours and decorations ==
- 6 August 1918: Marshal of France
- 19 July 1919 : Field Marshal of the United Kingdom
- 25 March 1921: Honorary Colonel (the first) of the Royal 22nd Regiment of the Canadian Army
- 13 April 1923: Marshal of Poland

== Honours and awards ==
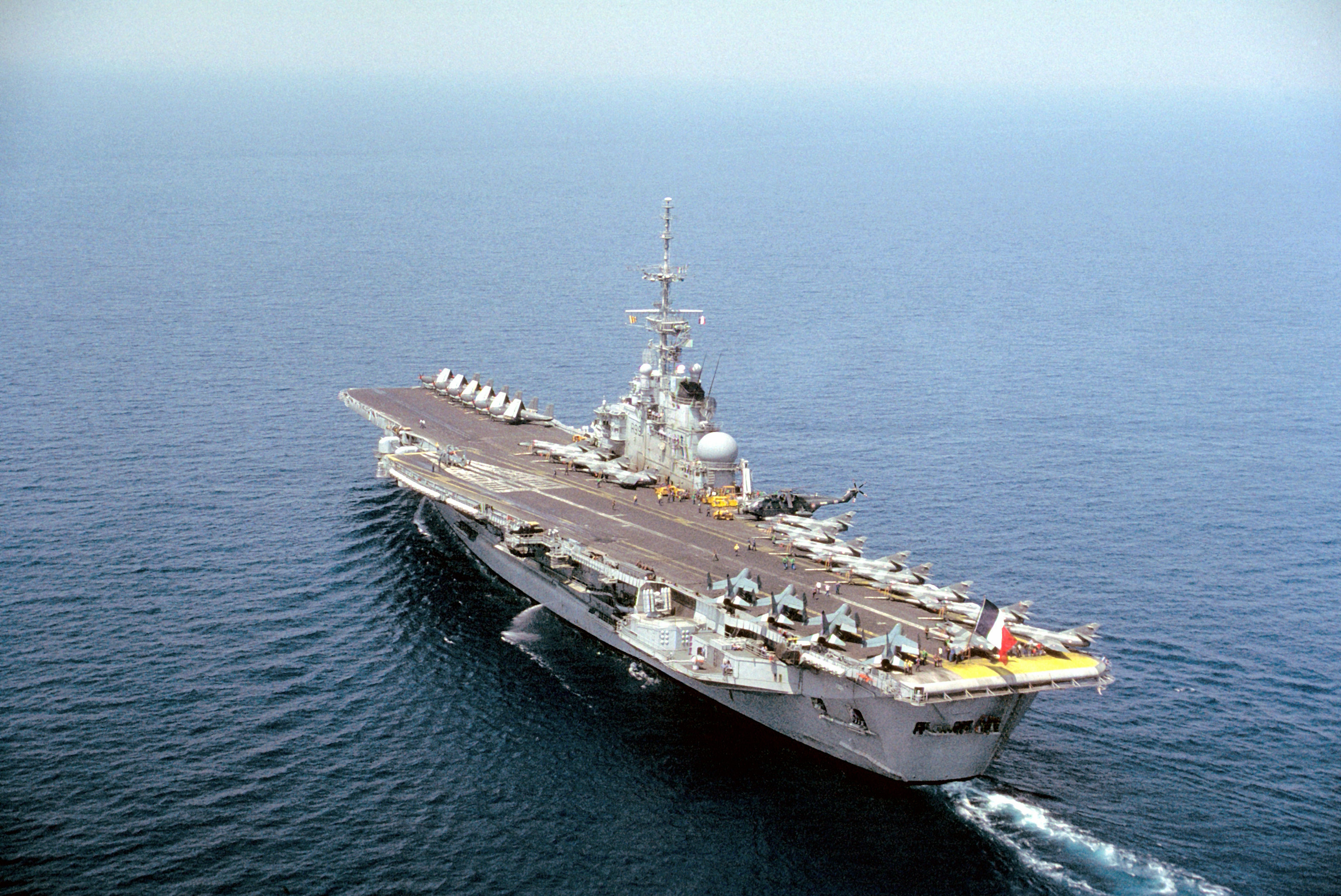
The aircraft carrier Foch (R99) was named in his honor.

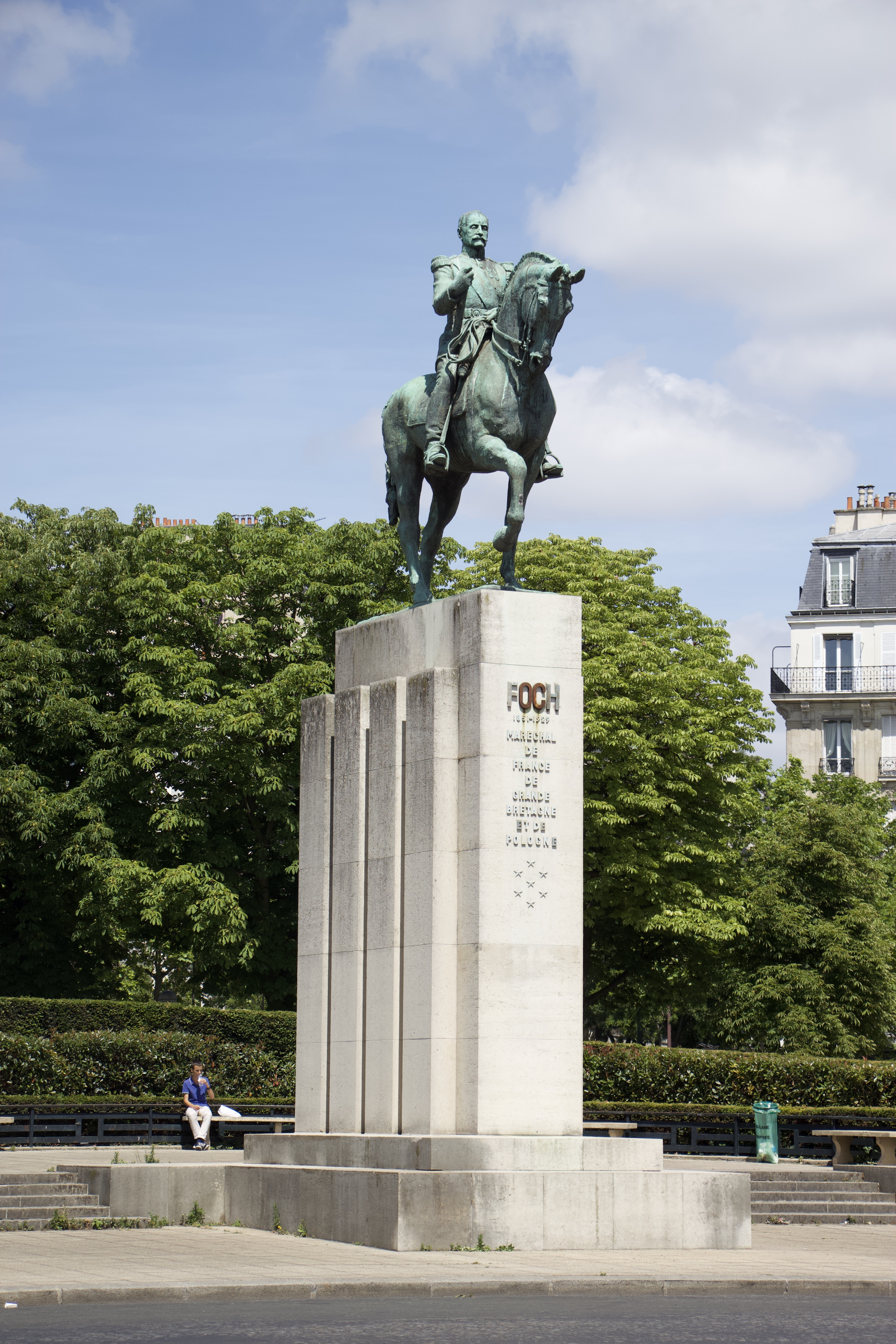
Equestrian statue of Marshal Ferdinand Foch in Paris, France.

A heavy cruiser and an aircraft carrier were named in his honor. An early district of Gdynia, Poland was also named "Foch" after the Marshal but was renamed by the communist government after the Second World War. Nevertheless, one of the major avenues of the City of Bydgoszcz, located then in the Polish corridor, holds Foch's name as sign of gratitude for his campaigning for an independent Poland. Avenue Foch, a street in Paris, was named after him. Several other streets have been named in his honor in Melbourne, Ypres, Lyon, Kraków, Chrzanów, Grenoble, Quito, Beirut, New Orleans, Truth or Consequences, New Mexico, Wynnum, Cambridge, Massachusetts, Mineola, New York, Queens, New York, Milltown, Shanghai (now part of Yan'a Road) and Singapore (Foch Road). A city quarter in the former French sector of Berlin is called Cité Foch in his honor. This is where French garrison soldiers were housed while Berlin was divided. Fochville in South Africa was also named in his honour. A statue of Foch stands near Victoria railway station in London. He is the only Frenchman ever to be made an honorary field-marshal by the British. A statue of Foch stands on the Bapaume-Peronne road, near the village of Bouchavesnes, at the point where Messimy's chasseurs broke through on 12 September 1916. General Debeney spoke at the statue's unveiling in 1926, praising Foch's operational concepts of 1918. Foch also has a grape cultivar named after him. In the Belgian city of Leuven, one of the central squares was named after him after the First World War, but it was renamed in 2012. Mount Foch in Alberta is also named after him. The position of Marshal Foch Professor of French Literature at the University of Oxford was founded in 1918 shortly after the end of the First World War.

In the late 1920s, Foch Avenue in Mount Roskill, Auckland was named after him.

=== France ===
- Legion of Honour:

Knight: 9 July 1892
Officer: 11 July 1908
Commander: 31 December 1913
Grand Officer: 18 September 1914
Grand Cross: 8 October 1915

- Médaille militaire: 21 December 1916
- Croix de Guerre 1914–1918
- Commemorative medal of the 1870–1871 War
- Officer of the Order of Academic Palms

=== Foreign decorations ===
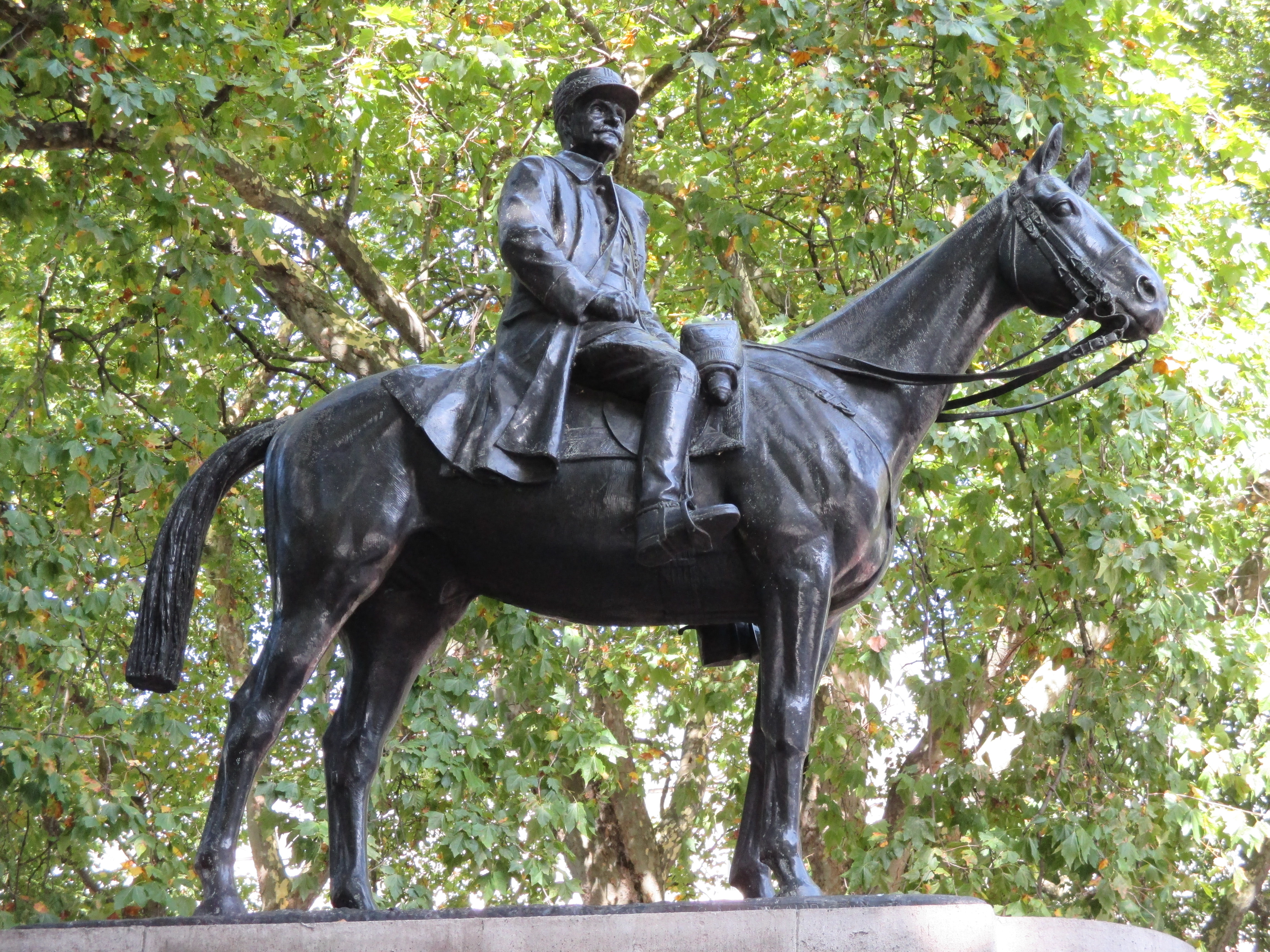
Statue of Foch in Victoria, London

- Order of Merit (United Kingdom)
- Honorary Knight Grand Cross of the Order of the Bath (United Kingdom)
- Distinguished Service Order (United Kingdom)
- Order of the White Eagle (Poland) (15 April 1923)
- Grand Cross of the Order of Virtuti Militari (15 April 1923, Poland)
- Grand Cross of the Order of Polonia Restituta (Poland)
- Grand Cross of the Order of Leopold (Belgium)
- Grand Cross of the Order of Ouissam Alaouite (Morocco)
- Distinguished Service Medal (United States Army)
- Grand Cross of the Order of the Redeemer (Greece)
- Order of Lāčplēsis 3rd Class (Latvia)
- Order of Saint George Second Class (Орден Святого Георгия, 1916, Russian Empire)
- Knight Grand Commander (First Class) of the Order of Rama (Senangapati, 16 November 1918, Thailand)

Foch received an honorary doctorate from the Jagiellonian University of Kraków in 1918. By special vote of the board of directors of the Knights of Columbus, he became the one millionth knight of that order. In 1921, he was elected an honorary member of the American Society of Mechanical Engineers, in part for his application of engineering principles during the prosecution of the war.

== Books by Ferdinand Foch ==
- Des principes de la guerre, 1903
- De la conduite de la guerre, 1904
- La bataille de Laon, mars 1814, 1909
- Préceptes et jugements, 1919
- Éloge de Du Guesclin, 1921
- Éloge de Napoléon, 1921
- Ce que j'ai appris à la guerre, 1927
- Les deux batailles de la Marne, 1928 (ouvrage collectif)
- Paroles de soldat, 1928
- Mémoires pour servir à l'histoire de la guerre de 1914-1918, 2 vol., 1931 (posthume)
- Dans La Revue de la cavalerie un article sur l'artillerie de la division de cavalerie au combat, un autre sur Mitrailleuse ou canon, une conférence sur L'Attaque décisive

== See also ==
- Army Manoeuvres of 1912
- Marcel Bigeard
- Foch Line
- Pierre Jeanpierre
- Lafayette Escadrille
- Jean de Lattre de Tassigny
- List of French paratrooper units
- List of streets named after Ferdinand Foch
- Marching Regiment of the Foreign Legion
- Moroccan Division
- Non-U.S. recipients of U.S. gallantry awards
- Russian Expeditionary Force in France
- Pierre Segretain

== Notes ==
Honorary titles
New title	Honorary Commander of The American Legion; 1926; Served alongside: General John J. Pershing	Title abolished
Awards and achievements
Preceded by Nicholas Longworth	Cover of Time magazine 16 March 1925	Succeeded by Eduard Benes
