= Foch Sitting Area =

Green space in Queens, New York

Coordinates: 40°40′40″N 73°48′09″W

Foch Sitting Area is a 0.051-acre (210 m^{2}) green public space in the South Jamaica neighborhood of Queens, New York, at the southeast corner of Foch Boulevard and the northbound service road of the Van Wyck Expressway. Like the adjacent Foch Boulevard, it is named after Ferdinand Foch, Marshal of France in World War I. The road, running between South Ozone Park and South Jamaica, was named following its completion in 1919.

The site of the Foch Sitting Area was acquired by the City of New York in 1946 and developed as part of the Van Wyck Expressway. The broad shoulder space along the highway’s path was planted with trees as a buffer while parcels that were too small to develop became playgrounds and sitting areas.
