= Hillcrest Veterans Square =

Public park in Queens, New York

Coordinates: 40.721284°N 73.805582°W

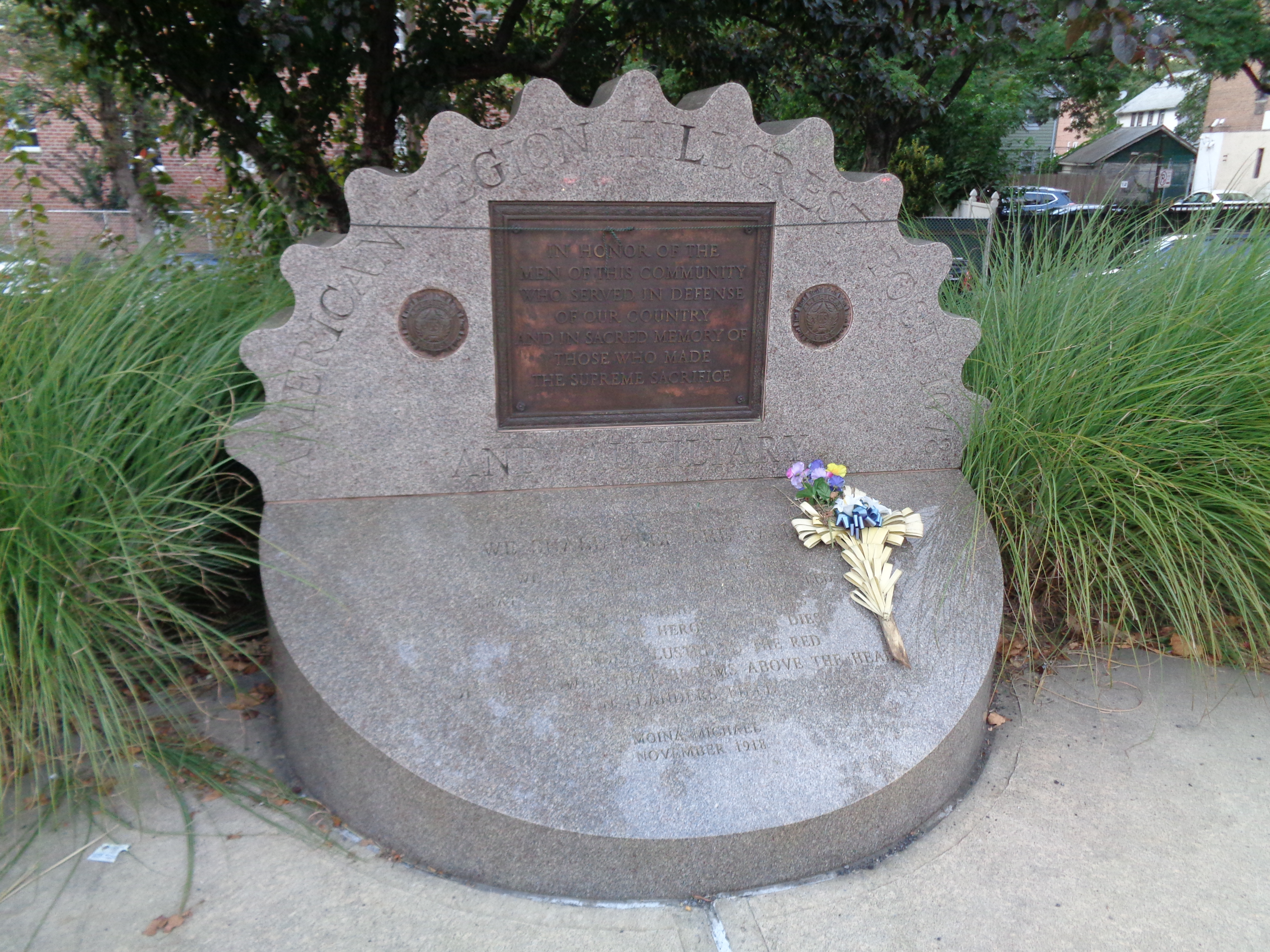
The monument in Hillcrest Veterans Square.

Hillcrest Veterans Square is a triangle-shaped public park located in Fresh Meadows, Queens, New York City.

== Description ==
The square contains a monument erected by Hillcrest Post No. 1078 of the American Legion. In 2005, the park's original monument to the veterans was replaced by a more detailed design. The new monument contains a plaque from the original monument along with excerpts from the poem "We Shall Keep the Faith" by Moina Michael. Its mention of the poppies growing in Flanders Fields inspired the use of this flower as a symbol of remembrance for those who fought in the First World War. In addition to the monument, Hillcrest Veterans Square contains a flagpole and a red maple tree.
