= McKenna Square =

Square in Manhattan, New York

Coordinates: 40.838431°N 73.939318°W

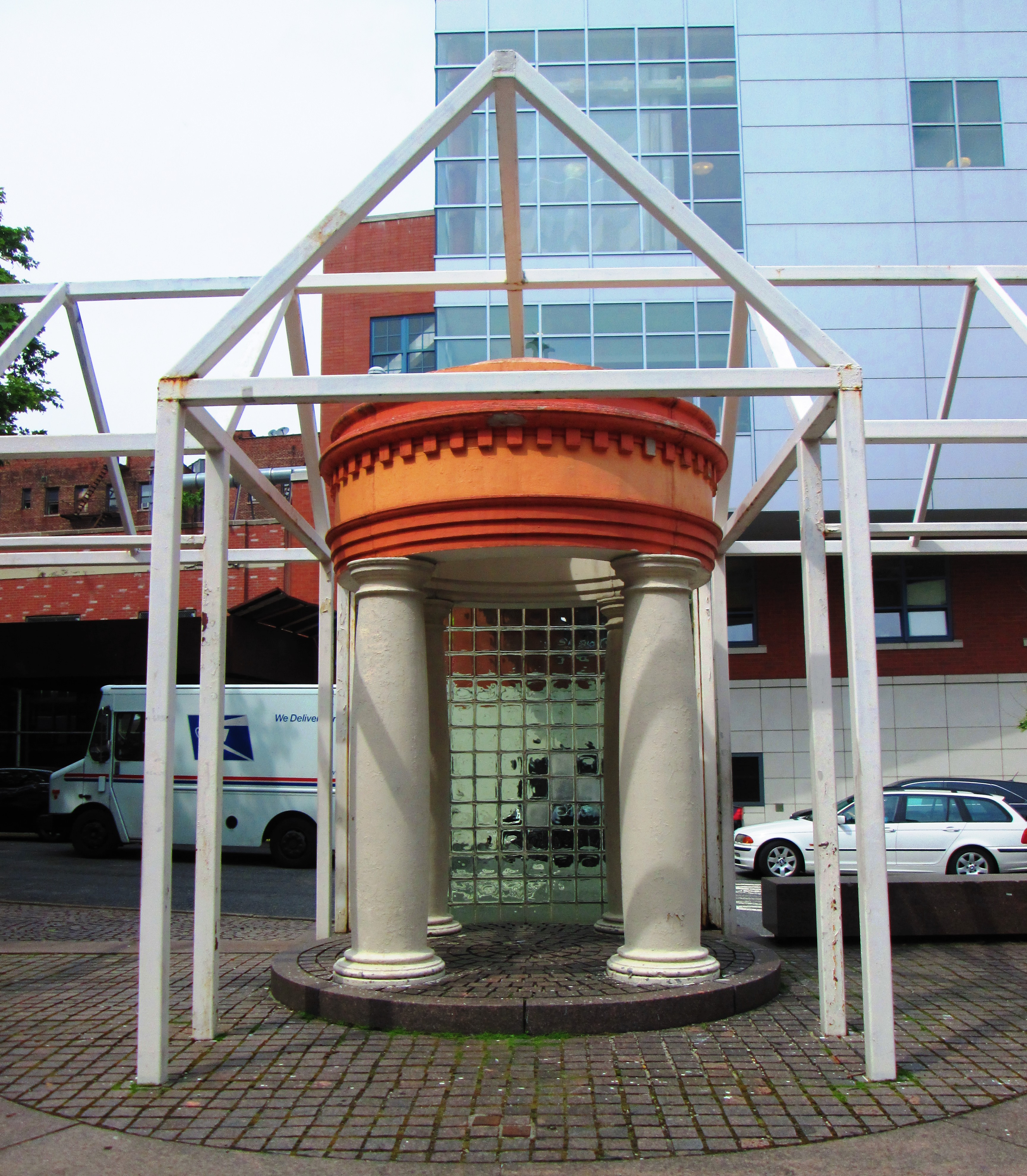

McKenna Square is a 0.24-acre public green space in the Washington Heights neighborhood of Upper Manhattan in New York City. The park is located in a median of West 165th Street, between Audubon and Amsterdam Avenues. The triangular site was created in 1917 in conjunction of the widening of West 165th Street and was transferred to Parks in 1937.

The site was named for Private William McKenna by the city’s Board of Aldermen on July 8, 1924. McKenna lived with his family West 173rd Street near Audubon Avenue. He was a member of an anti-aircraft battalion in World War I and was killed in action in the Battle of the Argonne Forest, near Reciecourt, France in 1918.

Prior to its use as a park, the northern side of the triangle was Croton Street, a roadway predating Manhattan’s street grid. Although the origin of the street’s name is unclear, across the city, the name evokes the Croton Aqueduct, which brought clean drinking water to the city in 1842, piped from the New Croton Reservoir in Westchester County. The street contained workers’ cottages populated by Irish immigrants into the early 20th century. Croton Street’s use as an address was discontinued soon after the triangle was created and it became the north side of West 165th Street.

The park was redeveloped in 1985 by the city Department of Housing Preservation and Development (HPD), and includes a central raised pavilion of steel, stone, and glass block. The park has rose-colored granite pavers indicating a winding path and London plane trees.
