= Ascenzi Square =

Square in Brooklyn, New York

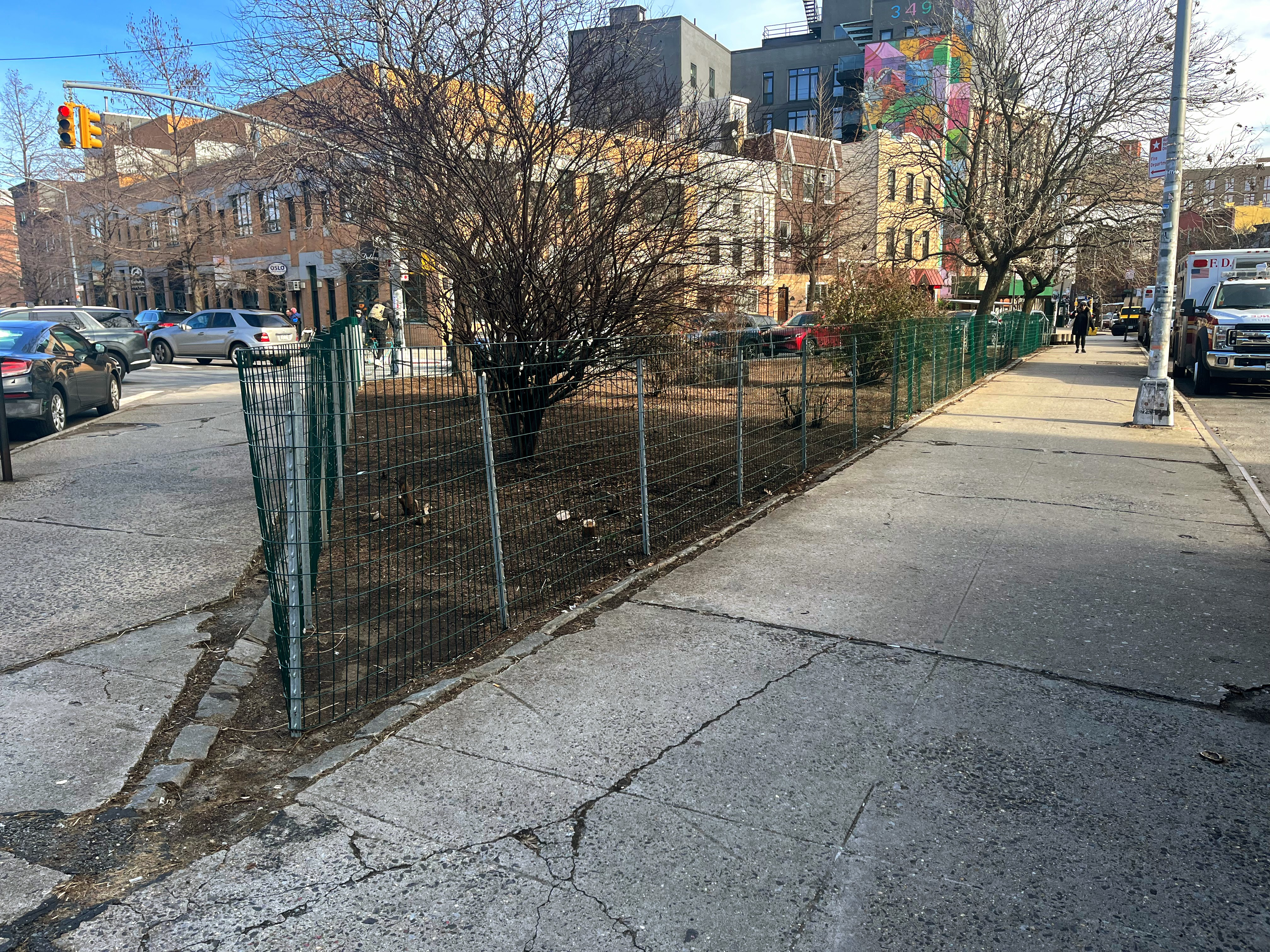
- Ascenzi Square in 2023
- Interactive map of Ascenzi Square
- Type: Urban green space
- Location: Williamsburg, Brooklyn, New York City
- Coordinates: 40.7146°N 73.9570°W
- Operator: New York City Parks Department
- Open: All year

Ascenzi Square is a small plaza formed by the intersection of two street grids that meet at Metropolitan Avenue in the Williamsburg neighborhood of Brooklyn, New York City. Roebling Street traverses both grids, making a slight jog to the southwest between North Fourth Street and Metropolitan Avenue. On March 29, 1939, the New York City Council designated this triangle as Ascenzi Square, in honor of brothers Joseph and William Ascenzi, residents of Williamsburg who were killed in the First World War.

Following their deaths, the local American Legion Post 1204 was renamed the Ascenzi Post and in 1938, this organization requested the renaming from the City Council. The two traffic triangles formed by Roebling Street were designated as a Greenstreets park around 2000. Greenstreets is a partnership between the New York City Parks Department and the city Department of Transportation that transforms unused traffic triangles and medians into green spaces.
