= Triangle 54 =

Green space in Queens, New York

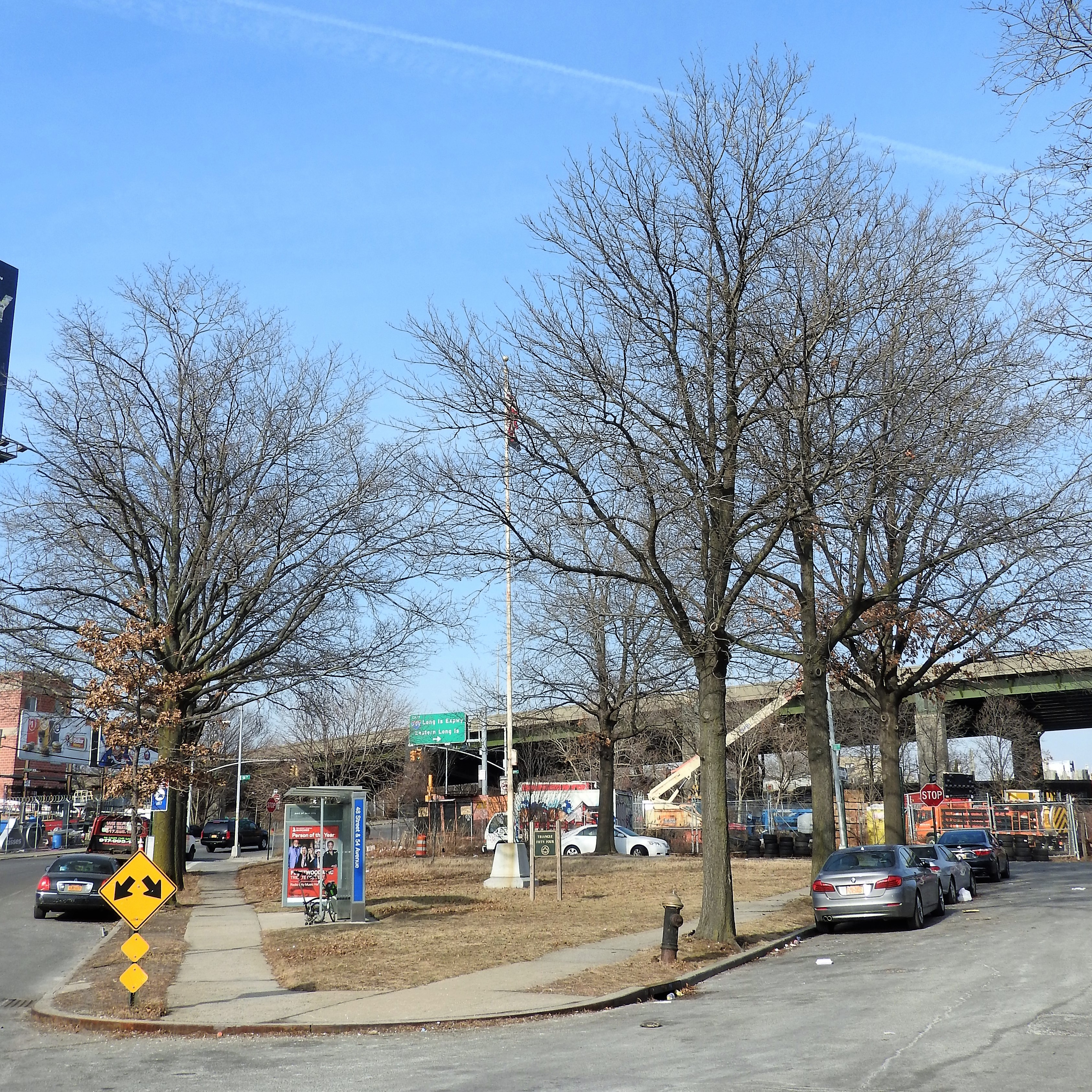
- Triangle 54
- Interactive map of Triangle 54
- Type: Public park
- Location: Laurel Hill, Maspeth, Queens, New York City, U.S.
- Coordinates: 40°43′51″N 73°55′08″W
- Area: 8,973.36 sq ft (833.652 m²)
- Created: 1930
- Operator: New York City Department of Parks and Recreation
- Status: Open all year

Triangle 54 is a 8,973.36-square-foot (833.652 m^{2}) public park located in the Laurel Hill neighborhood of Maspeth in Queens, New York City. This traffic triangle is bound by 48th Street on the southwest and east, and 54th Avenue on the north. The park contains ten trees and a memorial flagstaff in its center that dates to 1930. On its granite base is inscribed, "Erected by the citizens of Laurel Hill in memory of those who died in the World War." Laurel Hill is an old name for this area, which once had its own railroad station. The name still appears on the map in Laurel Hill Boulevard, which runs a few blocks to the north of this site.

In the years after World War II, that war was added to the inscription, along with the Korean War and Vietnam War.
