= Mall Eighteen =

Traffic median in Queens, New York

Coordinates: 40.783231°N 73.841774°W

Mall Eighteen is a traffic mall acquired by New York City for park purposes in 1913 and completed as a park in 1918. At the time, the eastern end of this park served as a plaza for the College Point Long Island Rail Road (LIRR) station. It is named after 18th Avenue on which it is located.

The area surrounding this community was first settled in 1645 when colonial Dutch Governor Willem Kieft purchased the parcel of land and granted use to Dutch and English families. College Point takes its name from St. Paul's College, a shortly-operated college that was founded in 1838 and discontinued in 1850.

College Point remained a primarily rural town until the mid-1850s, when rubber factory executive Conrad Poppenhusen arrived in the region and spurred a rapid industrialization of the area. To attract travelers and customers to College Point, Poppenhusen financed the construction of the Whitestone Branch of the LIRR in 1869. The rail line terminated at Whitestone Landing and each station featured charming Victorian architecture. In the railroad’s early years, College Point was a summer destination valued for its beer gardens and waterfront resorts. The area around the station served as a downtown for the village of College Point.

In 1930, American Legion Post 853, an organization of war veterans residing in College Point, submitted names of local servicemen killed in the First World War. The stone monument contains 20 names on its bronze plaque. Initially, the monument also included two captured cannons and cannonballs and a flagpole.

With the Prohibition, most beer gardens and hotels in College Point shuttered and ridership on the Whitestone Branch declined as well. The LIRR proposed leasing the railway to the city for use as a subway line. Failing to gain the city’s support, the LIRR commenced proceedings to abandon the line. On February 16, 1932, the last train departed from College Point. The once-bustling blocks around Mall Eighteen fell silent and the former train station became a warehouse.

The enduring presence of the College Point War Memorial serves as testament to the deeply embedded civic culture of a neighborhood that remembers its veterans in a location that was once the center of the community and its connection to the city.
