= Lawrence Harris =

American painter

Abandoned Ship, oil painting by Lawrence Harris

Lawrence Harris is an American painter who was born in Colorado Springs, Colorado in 1937. He studied art in both the United States and Europe. Harris is known for both impressionistic paintings (such as Abandoned Ship) and abstract compositions (such as The Cross).

His paintings are generally not dated and signed “L Harris” with the ‘L’ and ‘H’ partially superimposed. The Denver Art Museum is among the public collections holding work by Lawrence Harris. This artist should not be confused with the Canadian landscape painter Lawren Harris (1885–1970).

== Auction record ==
The auction record for a painting by Lawrence Harris is $1,170. This record was set by Abandoned Ship, 72 by 48 inch oil painting on board sold December 13, 2007, at Best of the West Auctions (Colorado Springs, Colorado).
