= Georges Malissard =

French sculptor

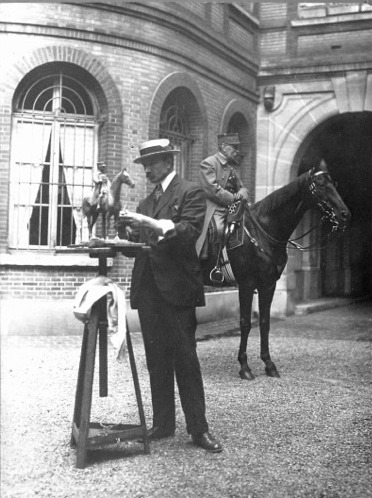
- Malissard, c. 1930
- Born: 3 October 1877; Anzin, France
- Died: 13 April 1942 (aged 64); Neuilly-sur-Seine, France
- Occupation: Sculptor

Georges Malissard (3 October 1877 – 13 April 1942) was a French sculptor. His work was part of the sculpture event in the art competition at the 1932 Summer Olympics.
