= 1914 French mobilization =

French mobilization procedures at the start of WWI

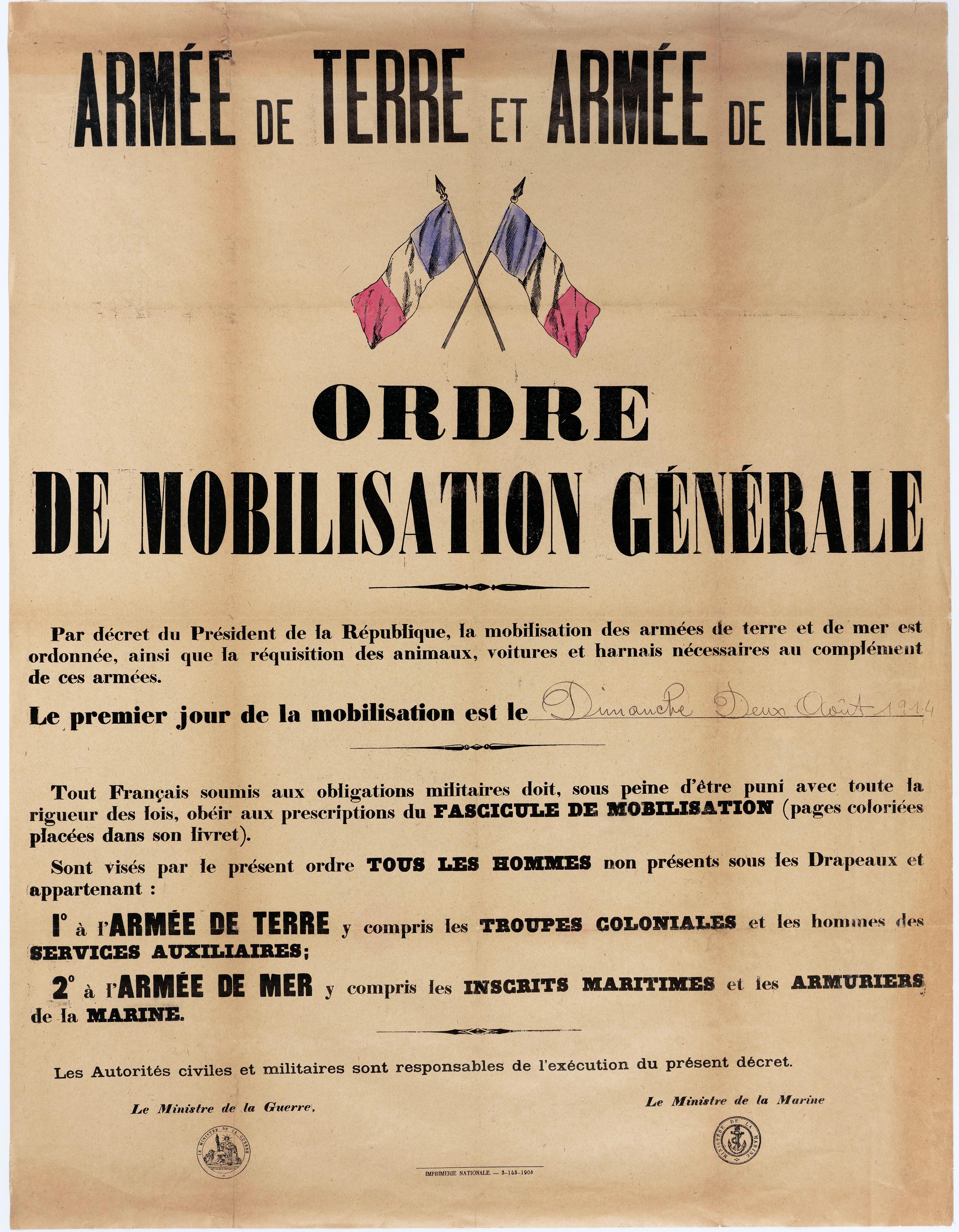
"General mobilization order" poster dated August 2, 1914, held by the French National Archives.

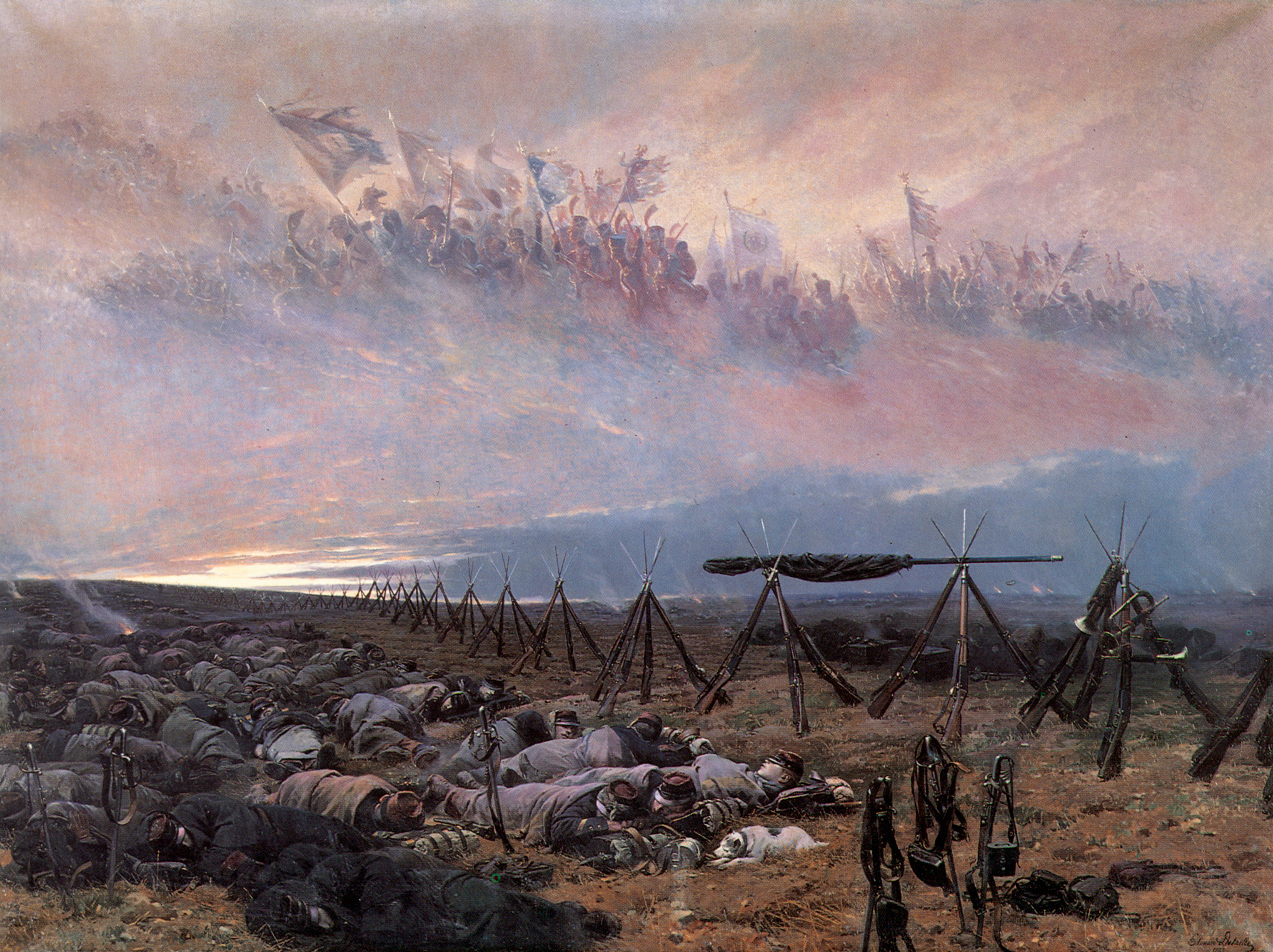
Édouard Detaille, Le Rêve (The dream), 1888: painting showing Third Republic conscripts on maneuvers, dreaming of their predecessors. This patriotic painting, measuring three by four meters and winning a prize at the 1888 Salon, was purchased by the French government and reproduced in large numbers.

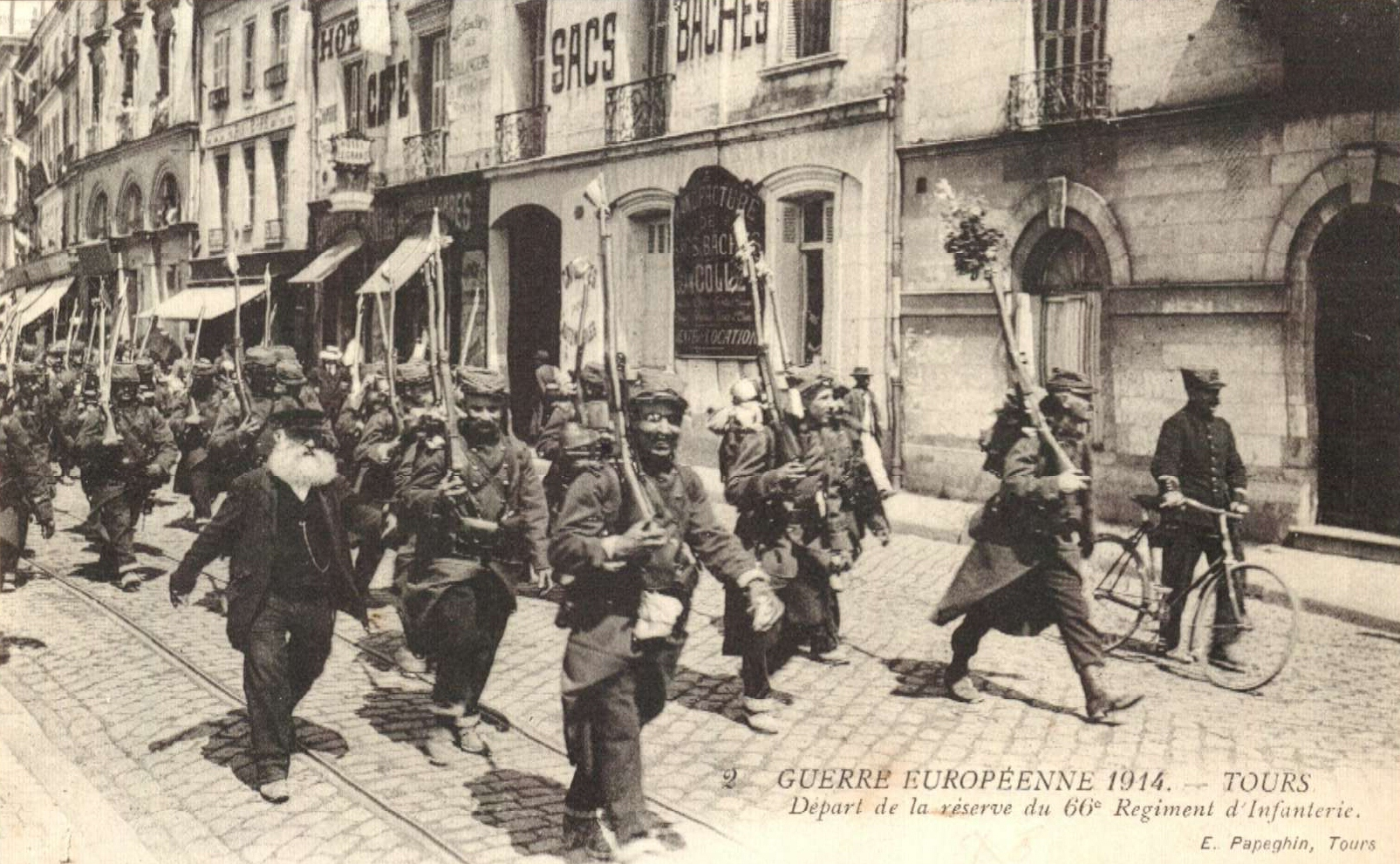
Soldiers of the 66th Infantry Regiment march with flags at the end of their rifles towards the station in Tours on the morning of August 5, 1914, arriving at Flavigny-sur-Moselle (near Nancy) on August 6.

The 1914 French mobilization was the set of operations at the very start of World War I that put the French Army and Navy in a position for war, including the theoretical call to arms of all Frenchmen fit for military service. Planned long before 1914 (via Plan XVII), each man's assignment was based on his age and residence.

It was triggered in response to equivalent measures taken by Germany, the French mobilization took place over 17 days, from August 2 to 18, 1914, and involved transporting, clothing, equipping and arming more than three million men in all French territories, both in metropolitan France and in some of the colonies, and then transporting them by rail to the potential theater of war, which at the time was considered to be the Franco-German border.

Such event had political (Sacred Union), socio-economic (due to the departure of almost all young men) and, of course, military consequences (the start of the Battle of the Frontiers). It was the first time that a general mobilization was declared in France (in 1870, only the professional army was mobilized); the second took place in 1939. In August 1914, 3,780,000 men were mobilized; in total, throughout the war, some 8,410,000 French soldiers and sailors were mobilized, including 7% indigenous soldiers.

== Preparation ==
The Industrial Revolution transformed the art of warfare, not only through the development of weapons and equipment, but above all through the ability of states to effectively mobilize armies with million of men. Since it was economically and socially impossible to keep them all permanently in uniform, they were left to live civilian lives during peacetime, and states mobilized them in the event of conflict, hoping to keep it short.

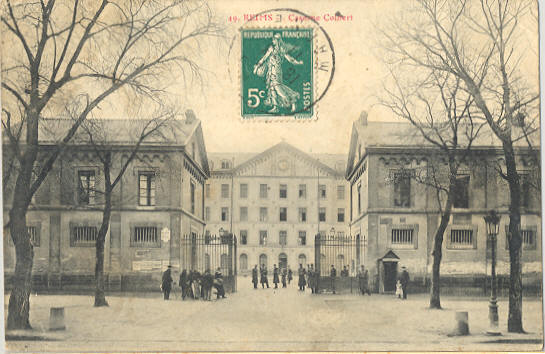
Most French towns served as garrisons: here, the entrance to the Colbert barracks in Reims in 1911 (home to the 132nd infantry regiment).

From the end of the 19th to the end of the 20th century, the French army was a conscription army, like all the armies of the great European continental powers of the time: A small cadre of volunteer career officers and NCOs would be supplemented by millions of reservists, who had received training through their mandatory two-year-service at age 20 and periodic refresher trainings. Only a small proportion of its units were fully composed of professional soldiers (notably some of the colonial troops and the Foreign Legion).

This was in line with the egalitarian ideology of some Republicans under the Third Republic, in a more militaristic and patriotic context: after 1871, conscript societies (whose members practiced gymnastics, shooting and military instruction from adolescence) multiplied, the Ministry of National Education set up a military education commission in 1881, the League of Patriots was founded in 1882, and schools formed school battalions as part of citizenship education, marching in uniform on July 14th and carrying "school rifles" from 1882 to 1889. By 1913, 221 provincial towns had garrisons, making uniforms a common sight on the streets, with parades, retreats (evening marches through the streets), military music and more.

=== Legislation ===
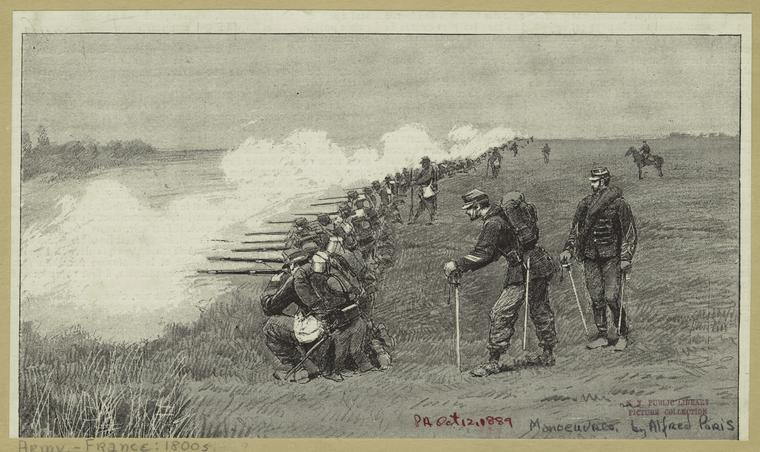
French infantry unit on maneuvers, 1889. Each capable man is trained during his service, then later returns to uniform for training "periods".

Following the Franco-Prussian War of 1870, the Third Republic organized the recruitment for its armies with the law of July 27, 1872 (or the Cissey law): "tout Français peut être appelé, depuis l'âge de vingt ans jusqu'à celui de quarante" ("any Frenchman may be called up, from the age of twenty to that of forty"), service was for five years, with selection by lottery, but with the possibility of being discharged (short stature, deformity, respiratory illness, etc.), replaced or exempted (family responsibilities, clergymen, teachers, etc.). Service was reduced from five to three years by the law of July 15, 1889 (or the Freycinet law). This situation was reformed by the law of March 21, 1905 (or the Berteaux law), (Note: The 1905 law on universal service is explained partly by the warmongering and Germanophobic climate that culminated in the Tangier crisis that same year, but also by the domestic policies of the Rouvier government (which was predominantly radical) with the law on the separation of Church and State that same year.) which abolished the drawing of lots, replacements and exemptions: henceforth, all men could be called up for two years. Finally, the law of August 7, 1913 (or the Barthou law) increased military service from two to three years.

The theoretical consequence of these laws was that, between 1905 and 1914, every French male who reached the age of 20 (just before the age of majority at the time) had to be registered on a nomination list, then do his military service for two, then three years in the active army (from age 21 to 23), before being returned to civilian life. For the eleven years following his service, men were assigned to the military reserve force (from age 24 to 34), then to the Territorial Army for seven years (from age 35 to 41), and finally to the Territorial Army Reserve for another seven years (from age 42 to 48). Men doing their service were transferred to active regiments, theoretically recruited locally; after their service, they were called up three times for maneuvers and exercises, two times for reservists (each one for four weeks) and one time for territorial army reservists (of only two weeks). In theory, men declared unfit for service due to physical incapacity were still subject to military obligations, in the form of auxiliary service (in offices, depots, the health service, etc.). A final case is that of the "special assigned", i.e. customs officers, forest hunters, men in field railway sections, and post and telegraph officers.

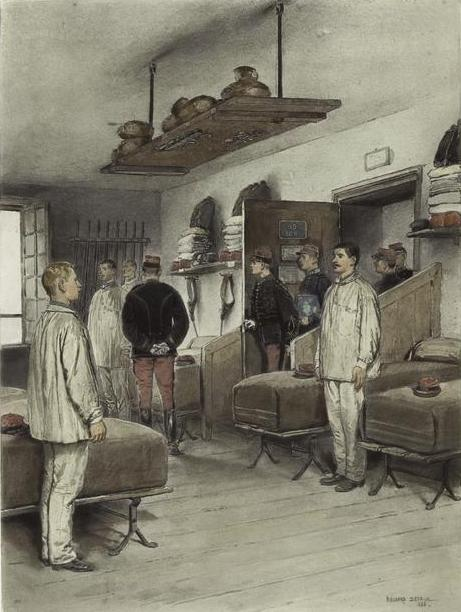
Édouard Detaille, Inspection des chambres (Room Inspection), 1885.

Each year, a "class" of conscripts was recruited: a class is a group of men born in the same year and fit for service. The number of a class corresponds to the year of its census, generally taken in December of the year in which they turned twenty; conscription took place the year after the census, in autumn. When mobilized, men from the active forces and the youngest reservists formed the units sent into combat, while older reservists were destined to form reserve regiments kept behind the front or to fill depots while waiting to replace casualties. The men of the territorial army formed units for tasks behind the front, such as the garrisoning of squares or entrenchment work. Finally, men from the Territorial Army Reserve were to be used to guard railroads and the coast.

The French Navy recruited its personnel in a different way, based on maritime recruitment: men engaged in maritime or river navigation were required to serve in the "army of the sea", with a five-year term of service in peacetime. However, as the fleet needed a large number of qualified technicians, recruitment was nationwide, with maritime enrollment providing only half of the fleet's manpower in the event of mobilization.

=== Planning ===
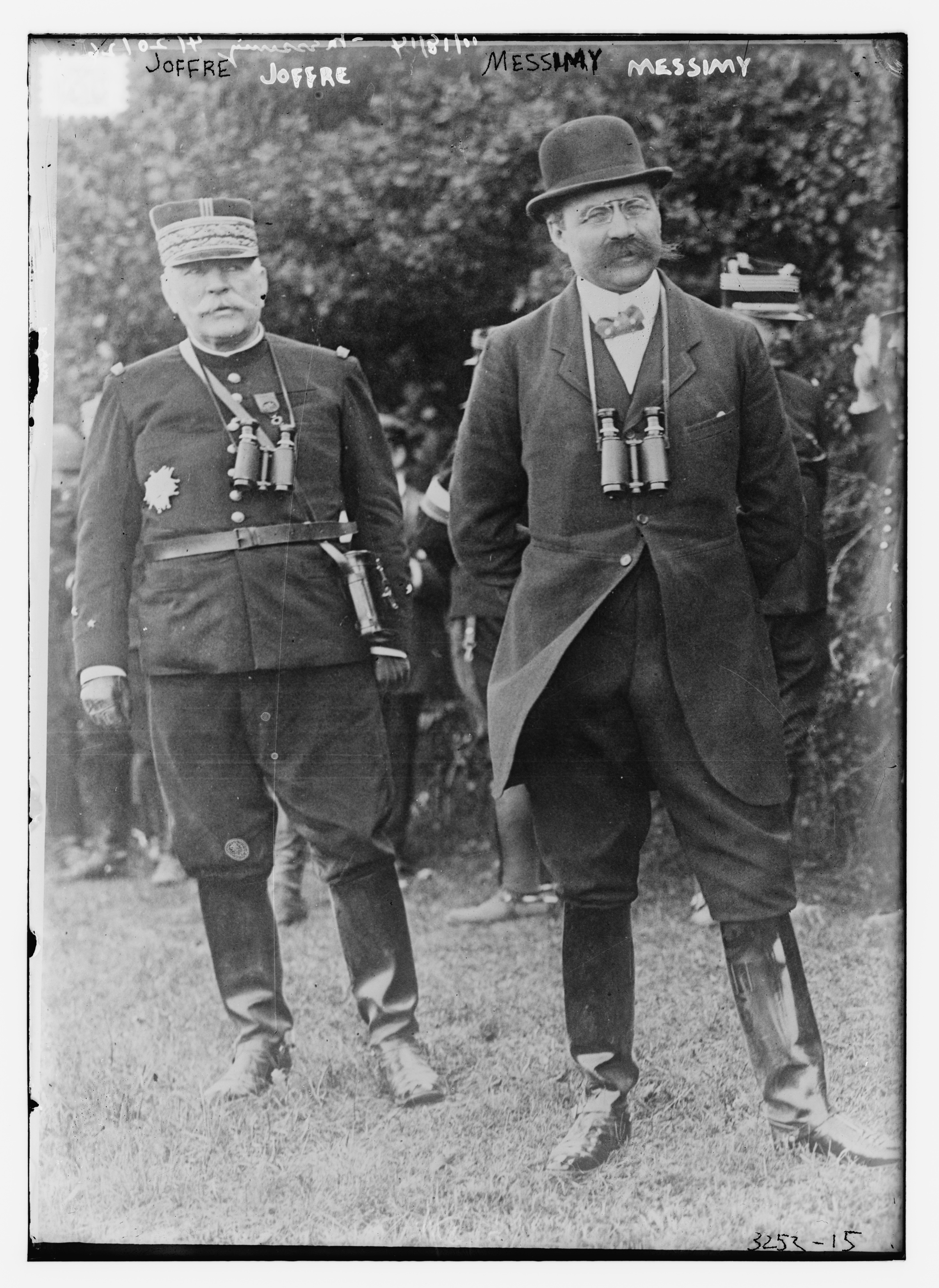
The two main leaders of the French armed forces in 1914: on the left, Joseph Joffre ( Commander-in-chief of the Army); on the right, Adolphe Messimy (Minister of War).

The entire mobilization was planned by the General Staff of the Army, headed since 1911 by Major General Joffre, in particular its 1st bureau (organization and mobilization of the army, headed in 1914 by Lieutenant colonel Émile Giraud) and 4th bureau (stages, railroads, troop transport by rail and water, headed by Lieutenant-Colonel Camille Ragueneau).

The plan applied in 1914 was Plan XVII, prepared in 1913 by the General Staff and validated by the Superior War Council. It provided for the mobilization of men, their concentration on the borders, their organization into several armies and the direction of the first offensives. But as all this would take around a fortnight, some of the active troops also needed to cover this mobilization. The role entrusted to the navy, which was outclassed by the German navy, was simply to protect troop convoys from Algeria and Morocco (in the hope that Italy would be neutral) and to block the English Channel to German ships (in the hope of British support).

==== Troops organization ====
In the event of partial mobilization (motivated by the "threat of aggression characterized by the gathering of armed foreign forces"), only the two youngest reserve units were called up. In the event of general mobilization, everyone was called up, without any individual notification. In his military brochure, each man was given a route sheet ("fascicule de mobilisation", or mobilization booklet, model A was pink if he needed to use the railroads, model A1 was light green if he had to march) with his call-up date and route (free of charge) to his base, where he was dressed, equipped and armed.

The four pages of the mobilization brochure (model A)

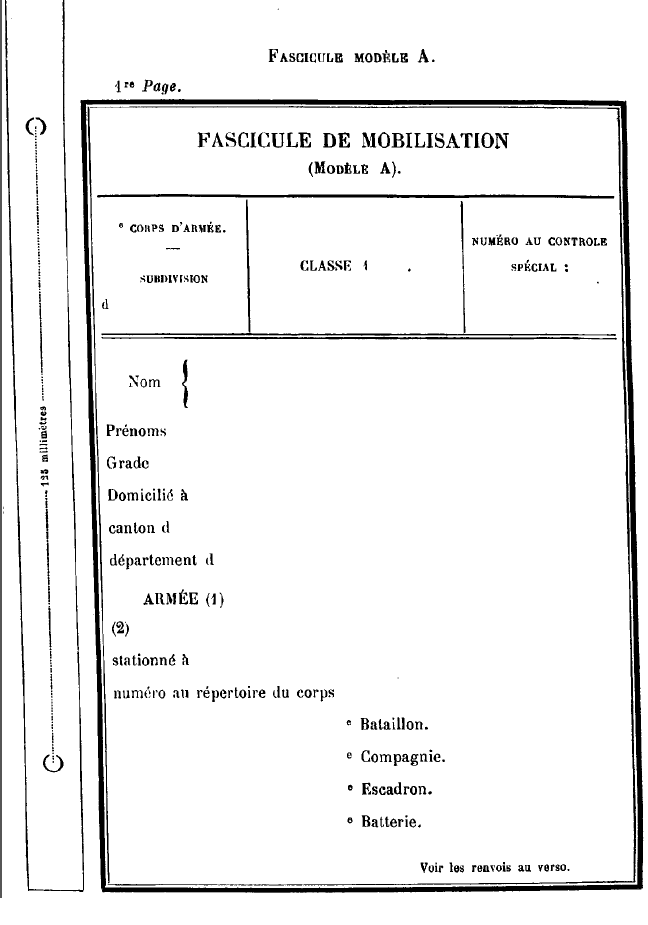
Holder's identity.

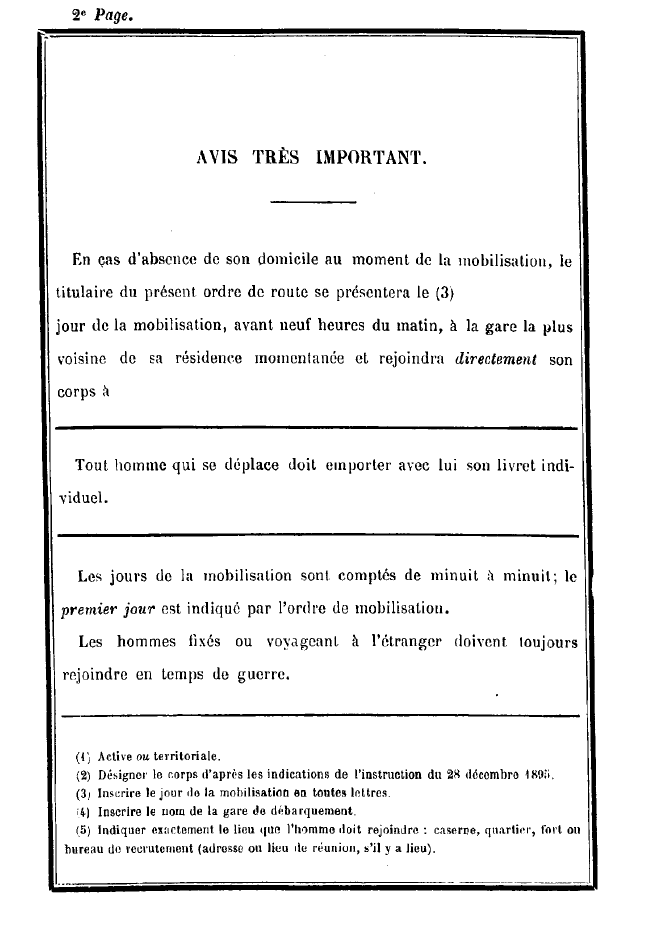
"Avis très important" (Very important notice)

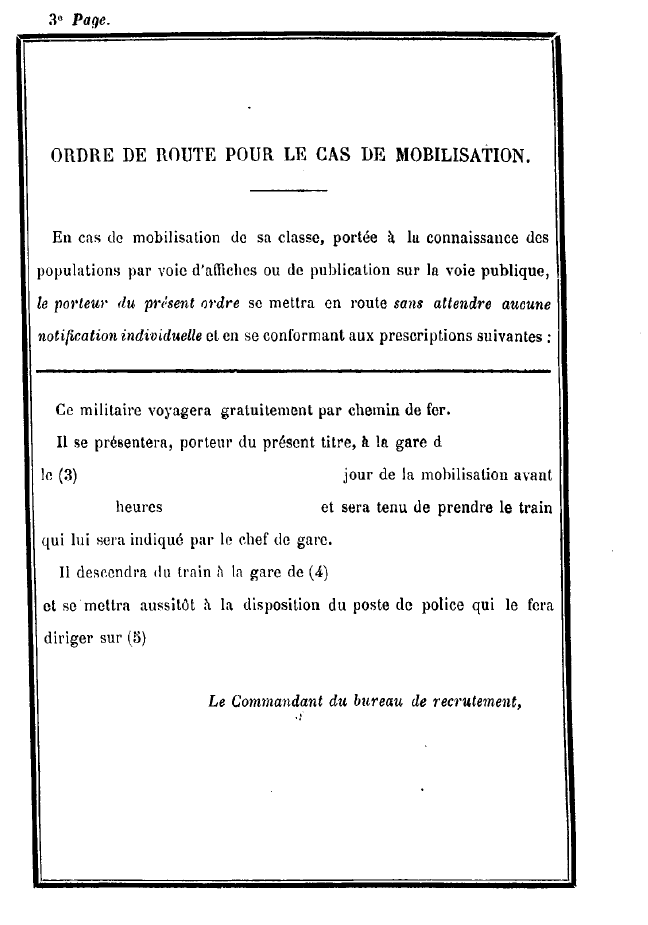
"Ordre de route pour le cas de mobilisation" (Route's order in case of mobilization)

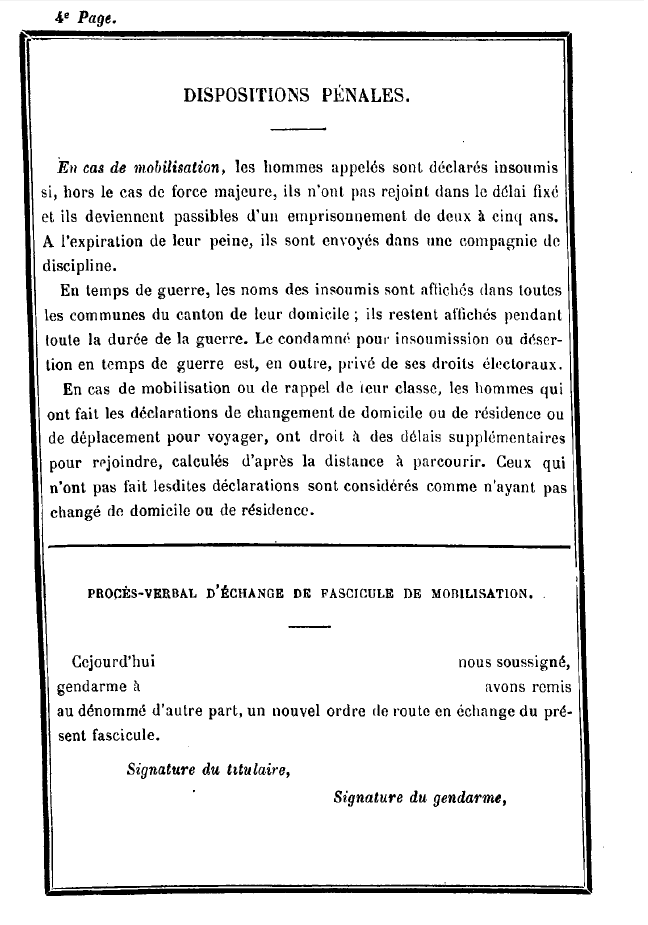
"Dispositions pénales" (Legal measures)

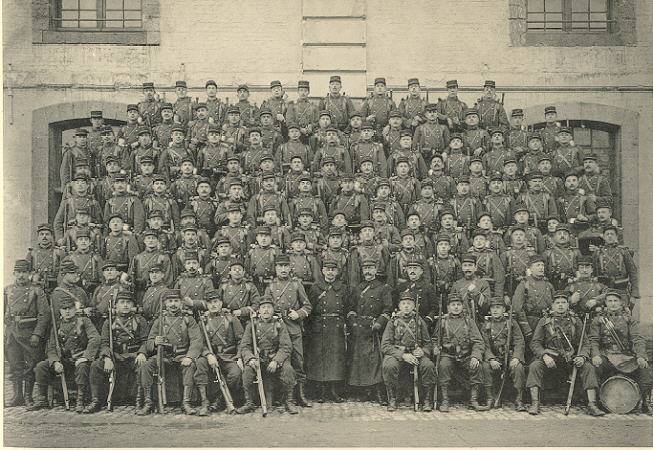
The 12th company of the 1st infantry regiment in 1911, stationed in Cambrai. Units were generally recruited locally, particularly in the infantry: soldiers of the 1er RI mainly come from the Cambrai district.

The different types of unit, theoretically recruited locally, were housed in the same barracks:

- Men doing their military service formed the backbone of the active regiments, mainly the 173 infantry regiments (numbered from 1 to 173), plus the 59 colonial and indigenous infantry regiments, the 89 cavalry regiments, the 87 artillery regiments, the 11 engineer regiments, as well as the service units (crew, management, health, aeronautics corps, etc.) (Note: In May 1914, the French army comprised: 173 infantry regiments, 31 foot chasseur battalions, 4 Zouave regiments, 9 Algerian tirailleurs regiments, 2 foreign regiments, 5 African light infantry battalions, 24 colonial infantry regiments, 6 colonial infantry marching regiments, one Annamite tirailleurs regiment, 4 Tonkinois tirailleurs regiments, 4 Senegalese tirailleurs regiments, 2 indigenous regiments (from Gabon and Chad), 3 Madagascan infantry regiments, 11 colonial battalions, 12 cuirassier regiments, 32 dragoon regiments, 21 chasseur regiments, 14 hussar regiments, 6 African chasseur regiments, 4 spahi regiments, 11 foot artillery regiments, 62 field artillery regiments, 5 heavy artillery regiments, 2 mountain artillery regiments, 7 colonial artillery regiments and 11 engineer regiments.)
- On Day 2, the arrival at the depots of the three youngest classes of reservists must bring all active regiments up to full wartime strength
- They were then replaced by the remaining reservists, who were to form reserve infantry regiments created during mobilization (numbered 201 to 421) in infantry regiment depots (numbered by adding 200 to the number);
- Finally, the territorial infantry, who formed 145 territorial infantry regiments, at least one in each military district subdivision.

Each infantry depot completes an active regiment (with three battalions), increasing it from 2,000 men to just over 3,200, then sets up a reserve regiment (with two battalions, numbered 5 and 6), followed by a territorial regiment. Finally the guard posts for communication routes (railroads, canals, telephone and telegraph lines). Each cavalry depot reinforces its cavalry regiment with two reserve squadrons; each artillery depot completes its artillery regiment and creates a reserve group (composed of several batteries); each engineer depot reinforces its regiment with new companies. A few hundred reservists are maintained in each depot to replace future losses.

The vote by the Chamber of Deputies on the Law of Three Years in 1913 was requested by the Army Staff, which wanted to have as many active units as its German counterpart, the Deutsches Heer (for fear of a possible sudden attack). Thanks to this law, the peacetime army grew from 520,000 to 736,000 men in uniform, each company from 90 to 140 men, with ten new infantry regiments (nos. 164 to 173). This force was structured into 22 corps, (Note: In 1914, each French army corps was theoretically composed of two infantry divisions (each with four infantry regiments, i.e. twelve battalions) supported by divisional artillery. The theoretical maximum strength of a corps is therefore 40,000 men (plus 8,900 horses and 120 75 mm cannon), an infantry division 16,000, a regiment 3,400 and a battalion 1,100.) each assigned to a military region (or "corps region": in 1914 there were twenty in Metropolitan France, plus one in Algeria).

Between 1914 and 1918, the core tactical element was the infantry division. On August 2, 1914, France mobilized 93 divisions, including 45 active, 25 reserve, 11 territorial, 2 colonial and 10 cavalry divisions. By November 11, 1918, France had 119 infantry divisions.

In 1914 the infantry division comprised:

- 4 infantry regiments with 3 battalions
- 1 field artillery regiment with 3 groups
- 1 cavalry squadron
- 1 engineer company
- 3 infantry regiments with 3 battalions
- 1 field artillery regiment with 3 groups
- 1 heavy artillery group
- 1 cavalry squadron
- 1 engineer company
- 1 squadron

==== Transportation to the border ====
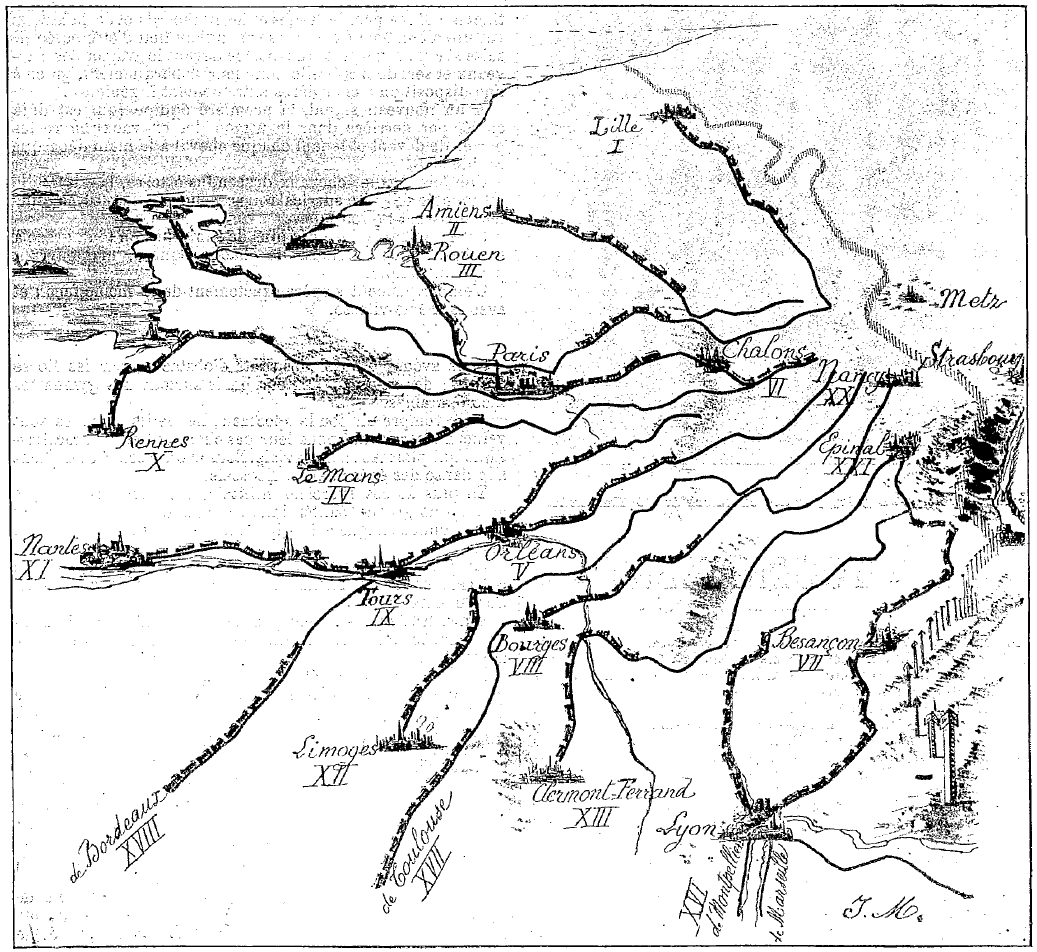
Diagram showing the various lines used to transport army corps.

Mobilization was determined by rail resources and by the strategy planned for the start of the conflict. The transport of all troops, known as "concentration", mobilized the majority of rolling stock, requisitioned on the advice of the Minister of War: one train was needed for a battalion, three trains for an infantry regiment, four for a cavalry regiment, seven for an infantry brigade, 26 for an infantry division and 117 for an army corps. These trains were made up of 34 (for a squadron) to 47 (for a battalion) wagons, making for 400-meter-long convoys, with passenger carriages, goods wagons (at a rate of eight horses or forty men per wagon) (Note: After the First World War, the OCEM (Office central d'études de matériel de chemins de fer, or Central Office for Railway Material Design) standardized the wagons with the words "Hommes 40 - Chevaux en long 8" (Men 40 - Horses in length 8) on them.) and flat wagons (for vans and cannons), (Note: For example, the 125th infantry regiment from Poitiers embarked in three parts, the first (a battalion and a machine-gun section) on August 5 in a train of 49 wagons: 2 for officers, 30 for troops, 10 for horses and 7 for carriages.) as required.

As a result, railroads were extensively developed for military reasons, each subprefecture was connected (Freycinet plan from 1879 to 1914), double tracks led eastwards (notably those from Paris to Nancy and Paris to Belfort) with ring roads between them, while some stations were enlarged (e.g. Gare de Paris-Est). Ten lines crossing metropolitan France were prepared by the General Instruction on the execution of the concentration (l'instruction générale sur l'exécution de la concentration) of February 15, 1909, rectified on April 4, 1914, each line designed to transport two army corps from their military regions to landing stations behind the concentration zone. From the 2nd to the 4th day of mobilization, these lines were to carry the second stage of the covering corps (the army corps stationed near the German border); on the 3rd and 4th days, the cavalry; from the 4th to the 10th day, all the army corps, starting with the "hasty" divisions of the 2nd, 5th and 8th corps (from the 4th to the 6th day); for day 13, all reserve divisions must be deployed; on day 16, the Army of Africa (part of the 19th Army Corps) arrived; finally, for day 17, all territorial divisions, fleets and logistics must be in place.

Overseas troops were a special case: the 19th Army Corps (mainly recruited and stationed in Algeria) had to supply two divisions (the 37th and 38th), which had to cross the Mediterranean on requisitioned ships and under the protection of French squadrons to land at Sète and Marseille. Colonial troops in the colonies were not included in the mobilization and concentration plan.

Railway lines for troop concentration
Line A concerned the 14th Army Corps, departing from Lyon station, then crossing Bourg-en-Bresse and Besançon to disembark at stations around Lure and Épinal.; Line B involved the 8th and 13th Army Corps, departing from the Clermont-Ferrand, Saint-Étienne, Bourges, and Dijon stations and converging at Charmes.; Line C involved the 15th and 16th Army Corps, departing from Marseille and Montpellier stations, then heading up the right bank of the Rhône, passing through Mâcon, Dijon, Langres and Mirecourt, ending at Pont-Saint-Vincent.; Line D involved the 9th and 18th Army Corps, departing from stations in Bayonne, Bordeaux, Angers, and Châteauroux, passing through Tours, Orléans, Troyes, Chaumont and Neufchâteau to arrive around Toul and Nancy.; Line E covers the 12th and 17th Army Corps, with stations in Toulouse, Montauban, Périgueux and Angoulême, passing through Limoges, Bourges, Auxerre and Brienne-le-Château to end at Commercy.	Line F concerned the 5th Army Corps, departing from the Orléans, Melun, and Paris-Est stations and disembarking near Bar-le-Duc and Saint-Mihiel.; Line G concerned the 4th and 11th Army Corps, departing from Vannes, Nantes, and Le Mans stations, then passing through Versailles, Choisy-le-Roi, and Reims, before ending around Verdun.; Line H is for the 3rd and 10th Army Corps, departing from Rennes and Rouen stations, via Mantes, Pontoise, Compiègne, Soissons, and Rethel, to land near Vouziers.; Line I concerned the 2nd Army Corps, departing from Amiens station, via Laon, Mézières, and Sedan, finishing around Stenay and Dun.; Line K concerned the 1st Army Corps, departing from Lille station, then via Douai, Valenciennes, and Avesnes, disembarking around Hirson and Rimogne.

==== Precautionary measures ====
Troops were stationed directly along the Franco-German border to protect mobilization from the very first day, relying on fortifications in the East. In the event of diplomatic tension, The instruction for preparing for mobilization (l'instruction sur la préparation de la mobilisation) provided for six groups of measures to be taken successively:

- group A (precautionary measures), recall of officers, volunteers and troops on the move;
- group B (surveillance measures), surveillance of the border and telegraph and telephone offices;
- group C (protective measures), guarding fortified structures and engineering works;
- group D, coastal surveillance and protection;
- group E (preparatory organizational measures), call-up for exercise of gendarmes, certain reservists and territorial guards of border communication routes, as well as the location of necessary horses;
- group F (preparatory measures for operations), loading of mine devices (to destroy border engineering structures), firing on suspicious aircraft, mobilization exercises for border garrisons, interruption of international power lines.

The "cover" (protection) of the mobilization was provided by five army corps, the first echelon of which was almost fully manned in peacetime, (Note: For example, the 152nd regiment was stationed at Gérardmer, with its depot at Langres, and belonged to the 7th corps (41st Remiremont division): its active manpower was 2,296, with mobilization adding 994 reservists, bringing the total to 3,290 men.) prepositioned along the Franco-German border: part of the 2nd corps at Mézières, the 6th corps at Verdun and Saint-Mihiel, the 20th corps at Toul and Nancy, the 21st corps at Épinal and Saint-Dié and the 7th corps at Remiremont and Belfort. Their mission under the XVII plan was "initially, to stop enemy reconnaissance or detachments seeking to penetrate the territory, and subsequently, to delay the march of larger corps that could disrupt the landing and concentration of armies". These corps were theoretically available in two echelons: the first between the 3rd and 8th hour of mobilization, the second from the 2nd to the 4th day; the 12th Reims division was to serve as reserve. Between days 4 and 6, the cover was to be reinforced by three "hasty" divisions (cover reinforcements) provided by the 2nd corps (the 3rd Amiens division), the 5th corps (the 9th Orléans division, temporarily transferred to the 6th corps) and the 8th corps (the 15th Dijon division, loaned to the 21st corps).

== Outbreak ==
Relations between Germany and France at the start of the 20th century were marked by a series of diplomatic tensions, most notably the two Moroccan crises: the Tangier crisis of 1905 and the Agadir crisis of 1911. However, it was through the alliances that these two states were forced to declare their mobilization.

Franco-German diplomatic tensions at the turn of the century

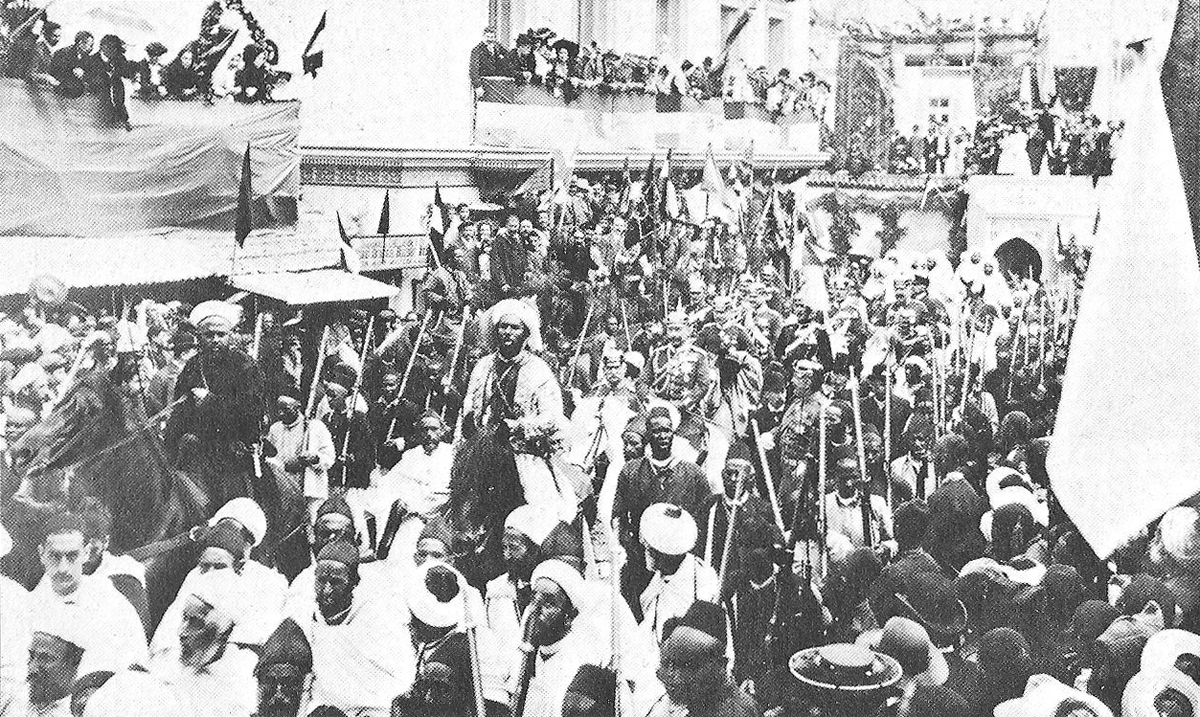
The Tangier crisis: Emperor Wilhelm II challenges French influence in Morocco in Tangier, March 31, 1905.

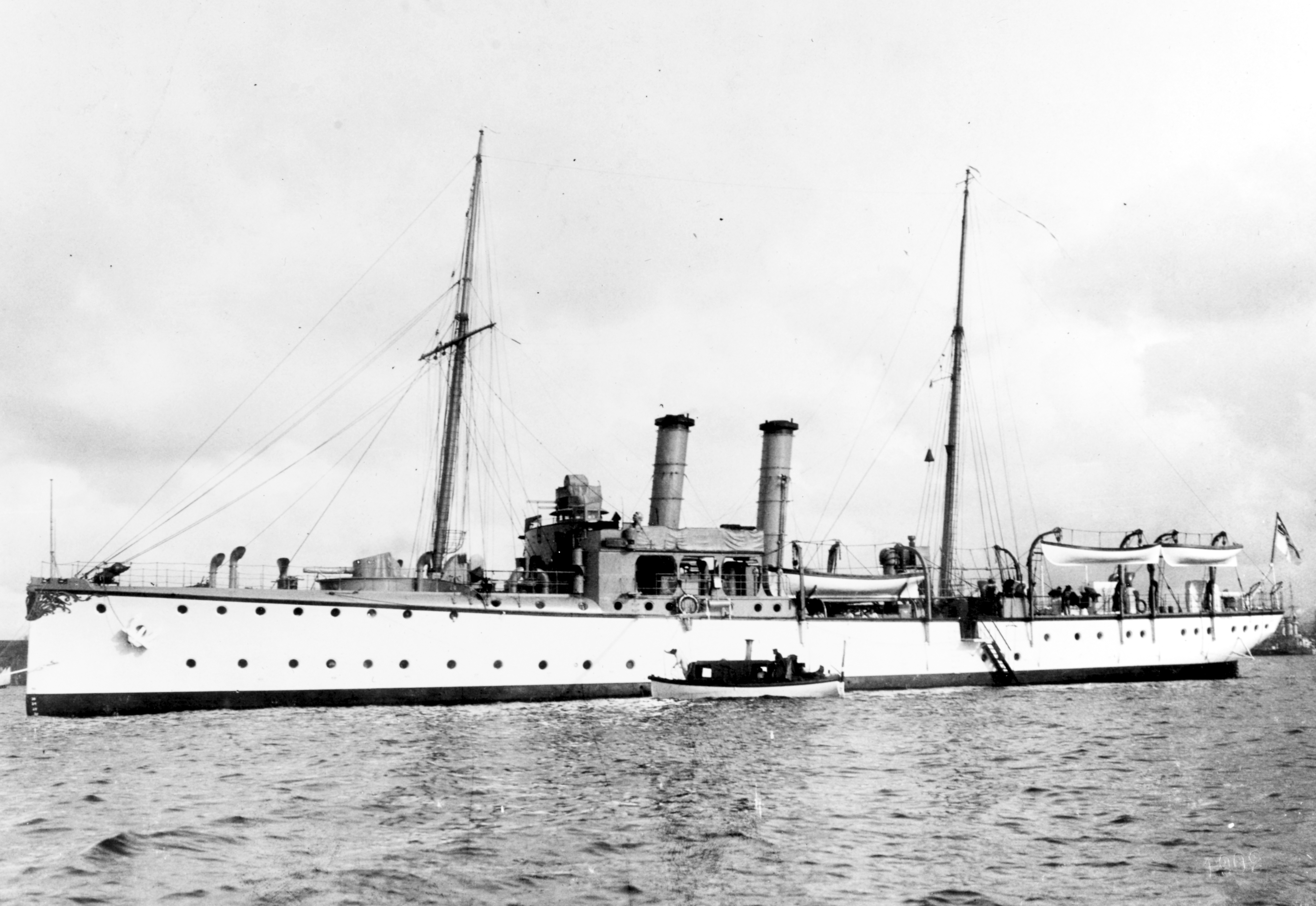
The Agadir coup: presence of the German gunboat SMS Panther in Agadir harbor in July 1911.

The Z IV (LZ 16) accidentally landed (due to bad weather) at Lunéville's Champ de Mars on April 3, 1913.

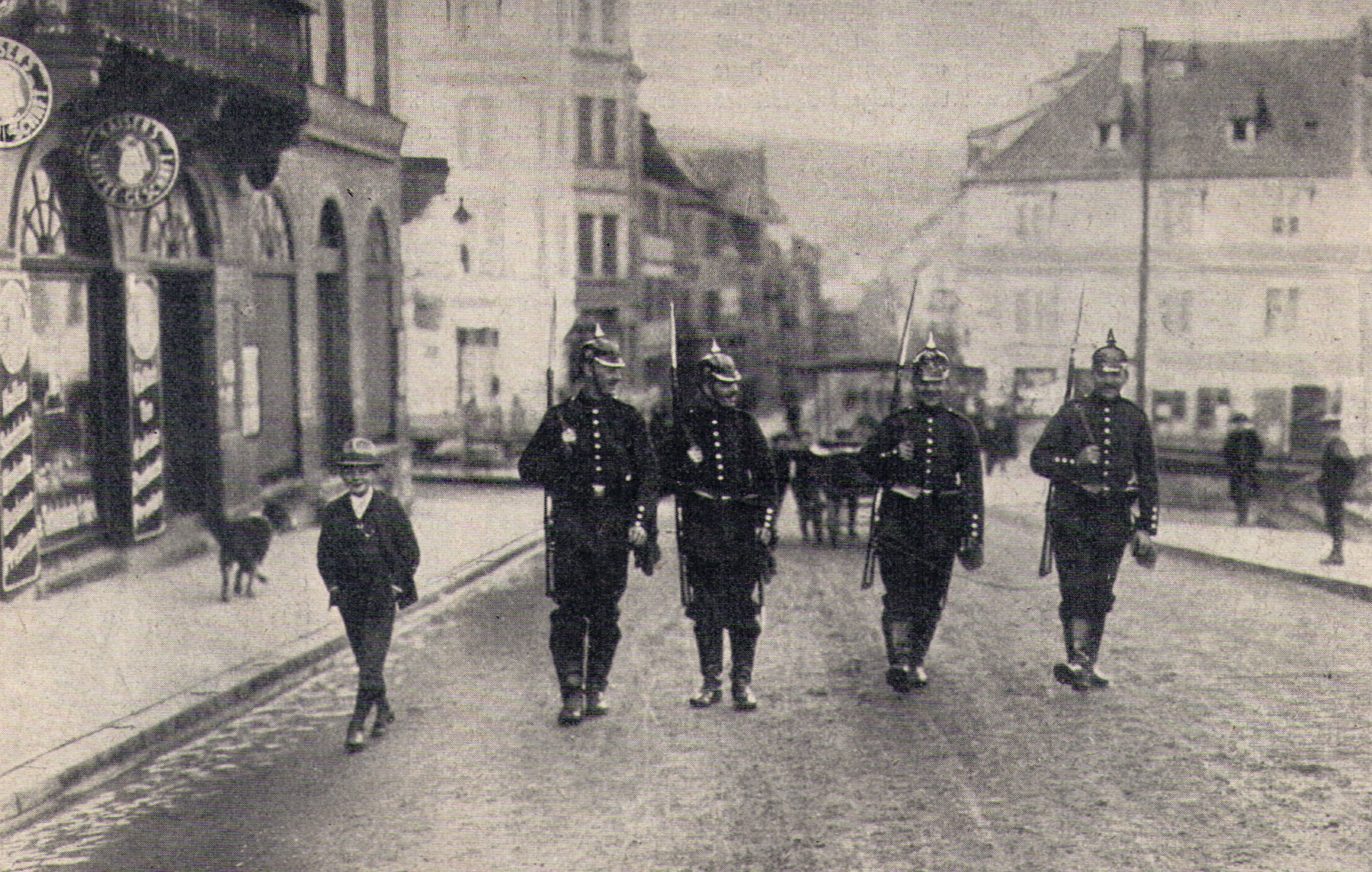
The Saverne Affair: pro-French demonstration suppressed by the German army in Saverne, November 1913.

=== July Crisis ===
The casus belli of the Assassination of Archduke Franz Ferdinandt triggered a succession of ultimatums, mobilizations and declarations of war that quickly spread to Germany and then France. On July 25, 1914, the Kingdom of Serbia decreed its mobilization in response to the Austro-Hungarian ultimatum; on the same day, Austria-Hungary announced partial mobilization from the 28th. On the 29th, the Russian Empire followed with a partial mobilization due to start on July 30. On the 30th, the Tsar ordered general mobilization, which had no other consequences than the inevitable Austrian (from the 31st) and German mobilizations. In France, at 7 a.m. on July 30, Chief of Staff Joffre asked War Minister Messimy for an order to mobilize, or at least to cover the borders, but did not receive it. The General warned the Minister: "If what we know of German intentions proves true, the enemy will enter our territory without firing a shot."

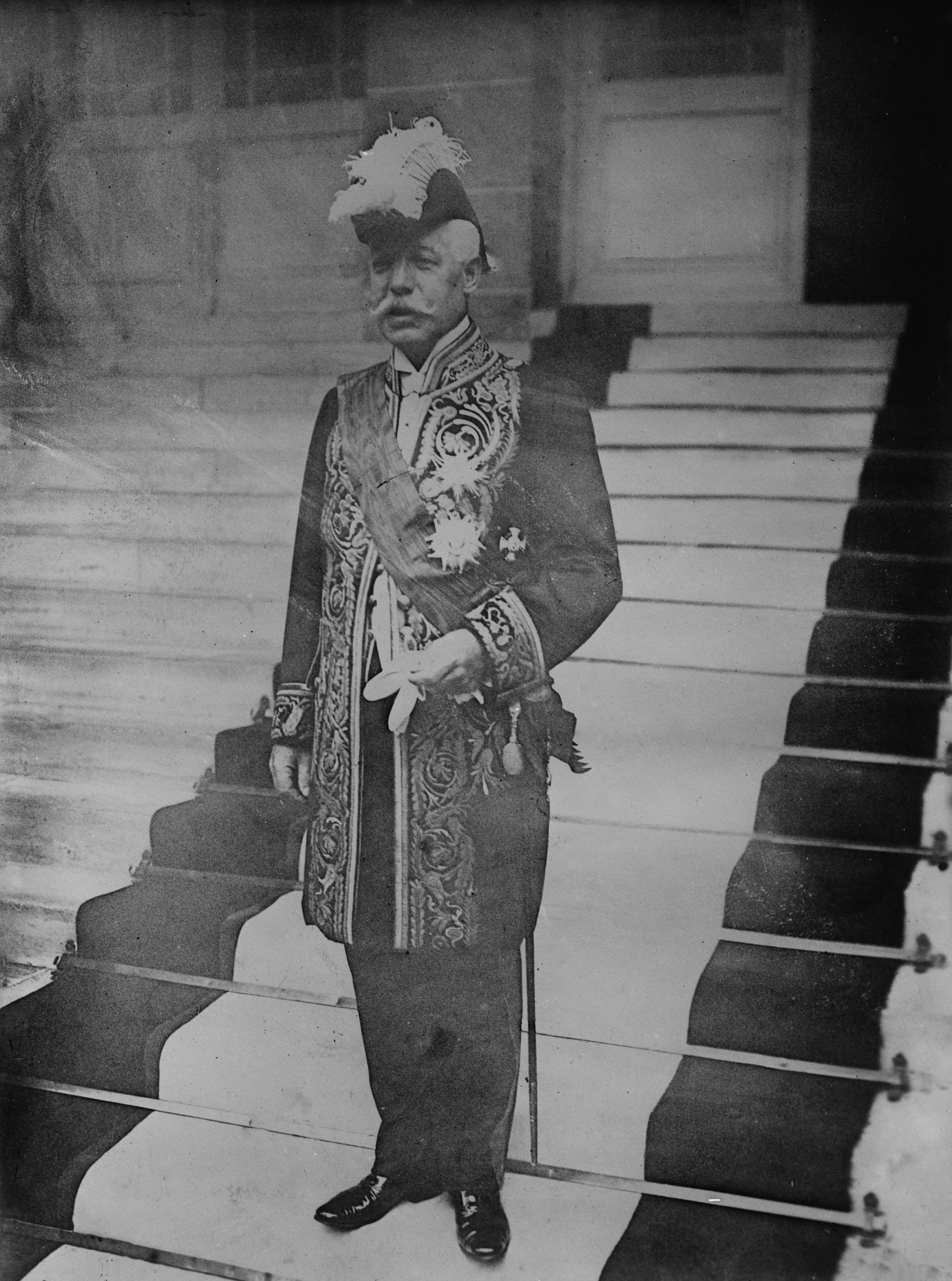
Baron von Schoen, German ambassador to France.

On the 31st, the German Empire decreed Kriegsgefahrzustand (a state of war danger: requisitions, border closures, etc.): Joffre again called for mobilization: "It is absolutely necessary that the government should know that, from this evening onwards, any delay of twenty-four hours in calling up reservists and sending the covering telegram will result in a retreat of our concentration force, i.e. in the initial abandonment of part of our territory" He obtained the covering order, but not the mobilization order: he sent the order by telegram at 5:40 p.m. to the various units, with application from 9 p.m. At 7 p.m., the German ambassador to France, Schoen, met the President of the Council, Viviani, and under the orders of the German Chancellor asked him whether France would remain neutral in the event of a Russo-German war: the Frenchman procrastinated ("allow me time to think").

=== Mobilization order ===
At 11 a.m. on August 1, Schoen met Viviani again to obtain the reply that "France will be guided by its interests". At 3:45 p.m., the French government (Note: Viviani did not sign the order, which was signed only by the Ministers of War and the Navy.) decreed the start of general mobilization on August 2. By 5:00 p.m. Kaiser Wilhelm II ordered the German mobilization, then declared war on Russia at 7 p.m. On the evening of the 2nd, Germany told the Belgian government not to oppose the passage of German troops through Belgium. On the 3rd, the German ambassador transmitted the declaration of war to France to the head of the French government at 6:45 p.m. (on the basis that French aircraft had attacked German territory) and left Paris, while Belgium refused to let German troops through.

The mobilization order was issued by the "Decree ordering the mobilization of the Army and Navy on August 1, 1914", published in the Journal Officiel on August 2. The telegram giving the mobilization order was sent from Paris at 3:55 p.m. on August 1 to corps, division and regiment commanders, as well as to prefects, who relayed it to sub-prefects and mayors; isolated rural communes were informed by gendarmes (on horseback or by car), then to hamlets by messengers sent by the mayors. The first poster was put up on August 1 at 4pm on the corner of Concorde and Rue Royale. The entire population was informed on the same day by posters, printed since 1904 (only the date needed to be completed), posted on public roads in each commune and then by the tocsin sounded by church and belfry bells.

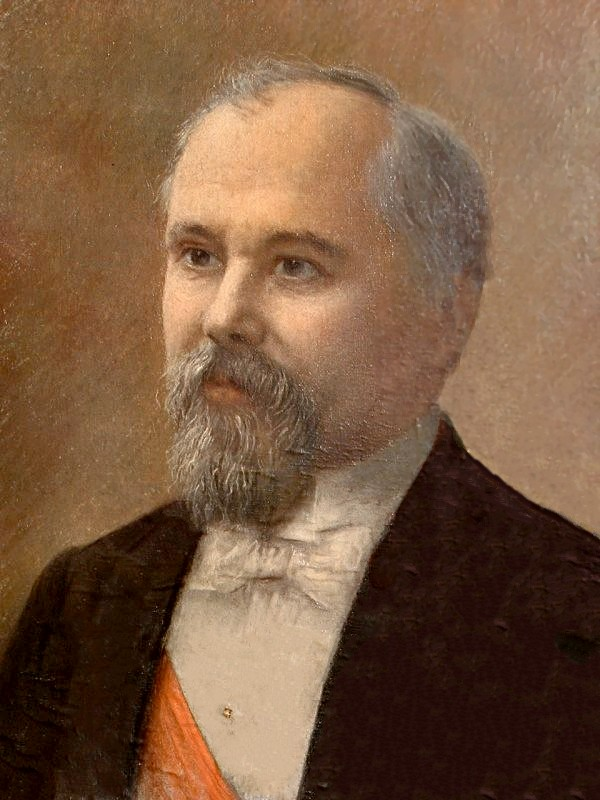
Meuse-born Raymond Poincaré, President in 1913, signs the mobilization decree (portrait by Carrier-Belleuse).

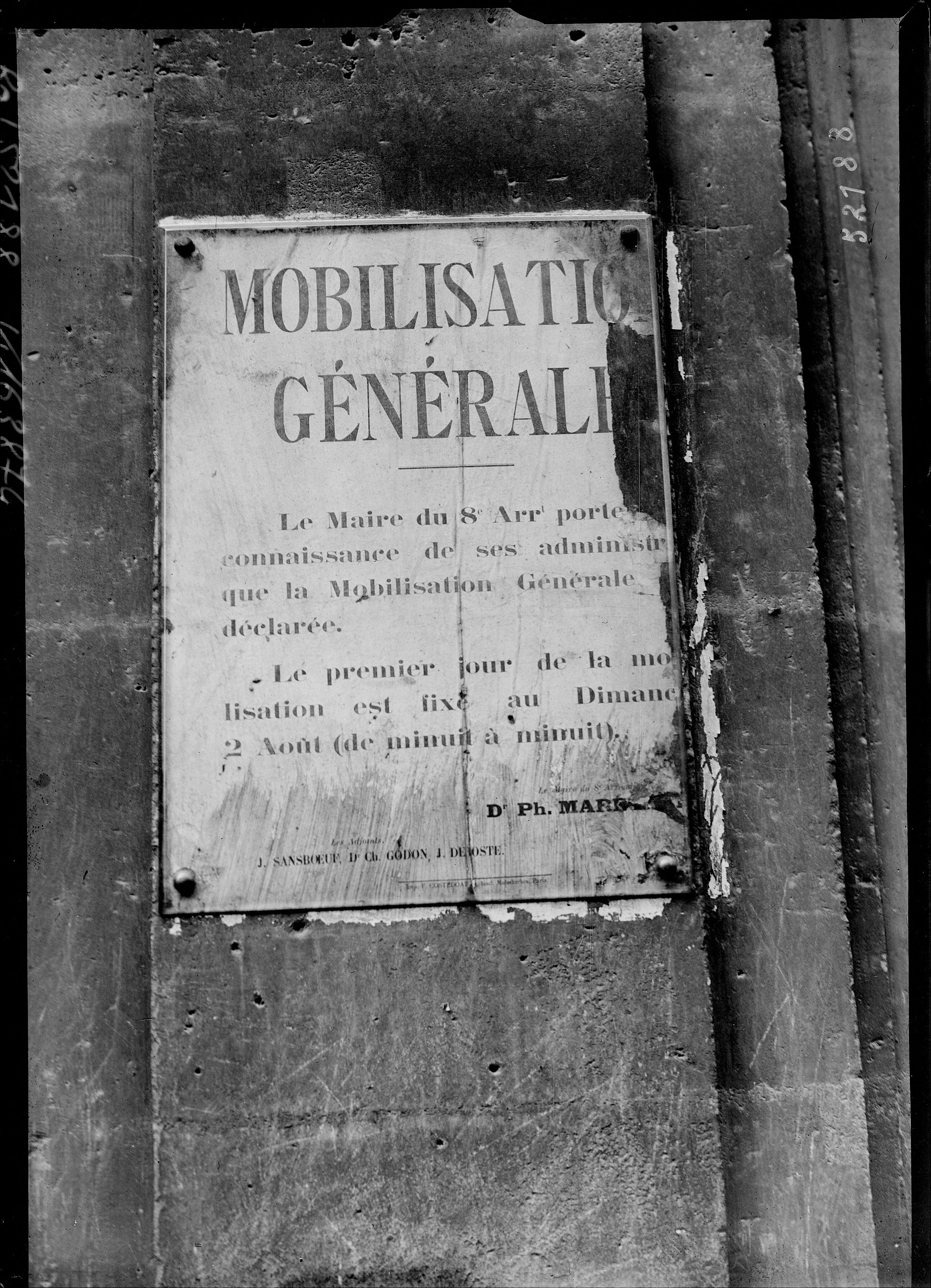
Municipal poster announcing the start of mobilization, posted on Rue Royale in Paris.

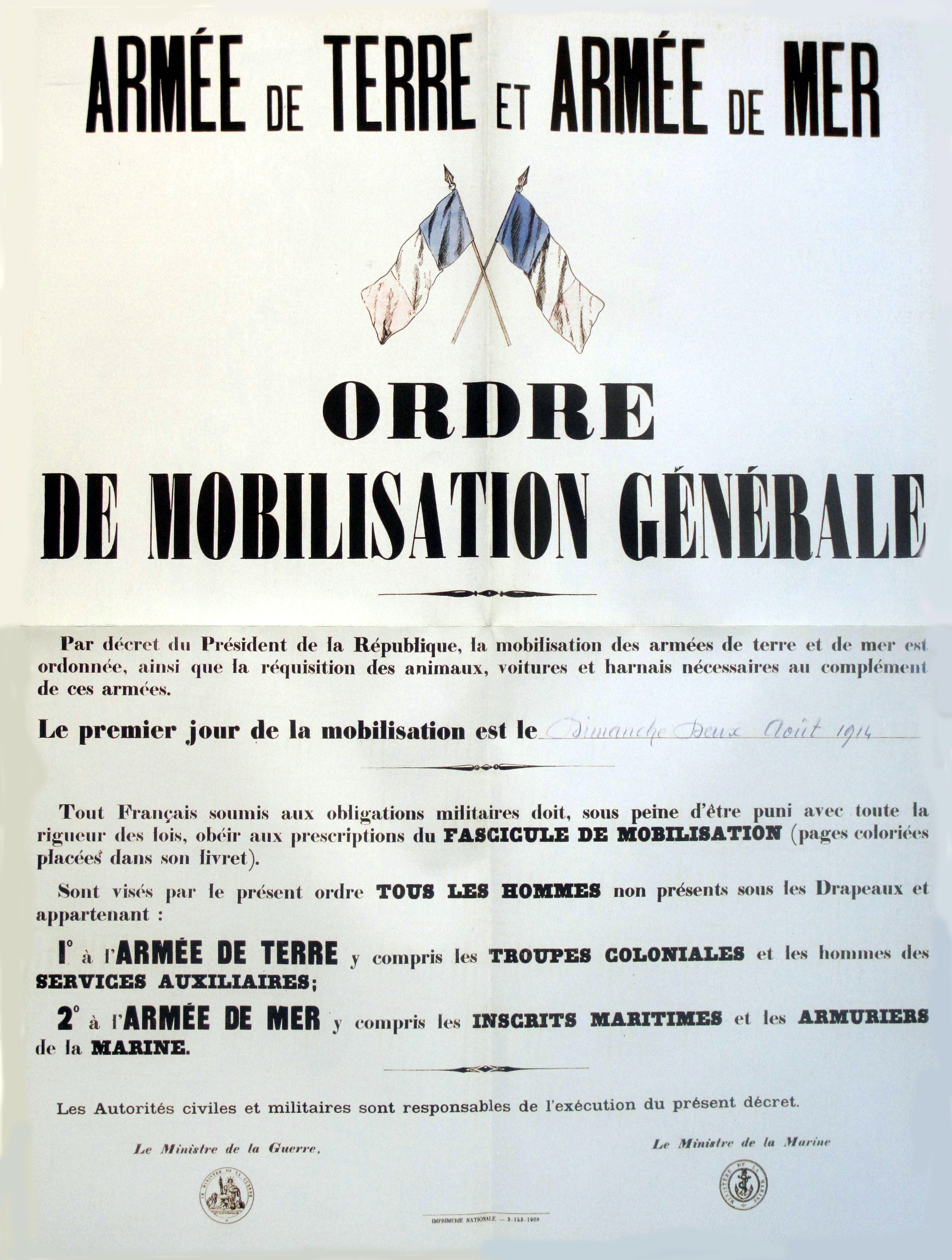
Poster transmitting the general mobilization order.

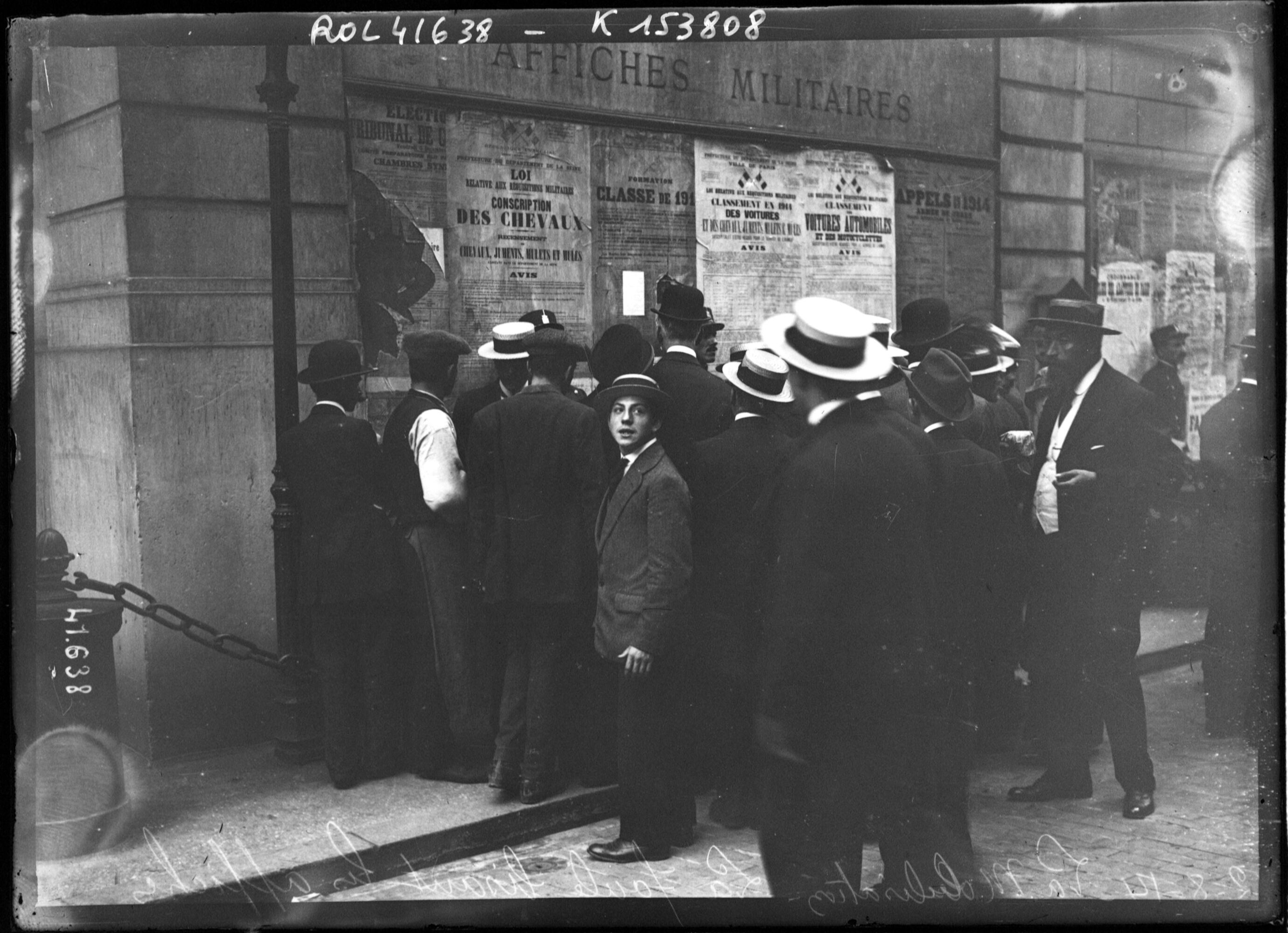

== First reactions ==
=== Astonishment then enthusiasm ===
The announcement of mobilization did not trigger widespread enthusiasm: as historian Jean-Jacques Becker points out, "probably the most widespread feeling among all sections of the population was one of surprise", particularly in rural areas where the press was less widely distributed than in cities. The astonishment expressed at the time clearly indicates that the mobilization initially took the population by surprise, as in Charente village Aignes:

« le premier août 1914, vers cinq heures du soir, la plupart des gens furent avertis, par le son de la cloche, que la mobilisation générale était décrétée. En effet quelques instants auparavant, la gendarmerie de Blanzac était venue en apporter la nouvelle au maire. Plus tard, la nouvelle fut confirmée dans tous les villages, par le tambour, qui apposait également les affiches spéciales. La première impression fut, pour tout le monde, une profonde stupéfaction car personne ne croyait la guerre possible. Néanmoins, les jours suivants, les départs s'effectuèrent avec la plus grande régularité. Les femmes retrouvèrent leur calme et les hommes, pleins d'enthousiasme, partaient en chantant »

["On August 1, 1914, at around five o'clock in the evening, most people were warned by the sound of the bell that general mobilization had been decreed. Indeed, a few moments earlier, the Blanzac gendarmerie had come to bring the news to the mayor. Later, the drummer confirmed the news in all the villages, who also put up the special posters. Everyone's first impression was one of profound amazement, for no one thought war was possible. Nevertheless, in the days that followed, the departures took place with the greatest regularity. The women regained their composure and the men, full of enthusiasm, set off singing"]

Similarly, in Nyons, a town in the Drôme region, a schoolteacher testifies: "The population, although prepared for the war for several days by the press, learned the unfortunate news with a sort of stupor. I saw some women crying. The men looked sad, but determined."

Analyzed by Jean-Jacques Becker, these documents show the different stages of popular reaction. The initial astonishment was often followed by a certain despondency: "consternation, sadness and anguish were widespread, far more so than feelings dictated by the patriotic impulse", and expressions of enthusiasm were rare. President Raymond Poincaré's proclamation, posted and published in the newspapers on August 2, was reassuring, emphasizing "mobilization is not war; on the contrary, in the present circumstances, it appears to be the best means of ensuring peace with honor. The government, strengthened by its ardent desire to reach a peaceful solution to the crisis and shielded by these necessary precautions, will continue its diplomatic efforts and still hopes to succeed. It is counting on the composure of the noble nation not to give way to unjustified emotion; it is counting on the patriotism of all Frenchmen, and knows that there is not one who is not ready to do his duty. At this hour, there are no more parties, there is an eternal, peaceful and resolute France. There is the entire country of law and justice, united in calm, vigilance and dignity".

However, the mood had changed by the time the soldiers left for their barracks, as described above in Aignes. Whereas before, expressions of enthusiasm had been infrequent, now they were more spectacular, particularly at the embarkation stations for mobilized soldiers, demonstrating a genuine patriotic impulse imbued with seriousness and a determination to do one's duty, despite the frequent tears shed by the women or the more or less heart-rending farewells. How can this change in mood be explained? According to Jean-Jacques Becker, revanchist sentiments linked to the 1870 war and the loss of Alsace-Lorraine played little part. French public opinion was dominated by the idea of a peaceful France, obliged to defend itself against outright German aggression. Under these conditions, refusing to fight was out of the question. Men set off, "not with the enthusiasm of a conqueror, but with the resolution of a duty to be fulfilled", an idea also reflected in the testimony of historian Marc Bloch, who was himself mobilized: "Most of the men were not cheerful: they were resolute, which was better."

=== Xenophobia ===
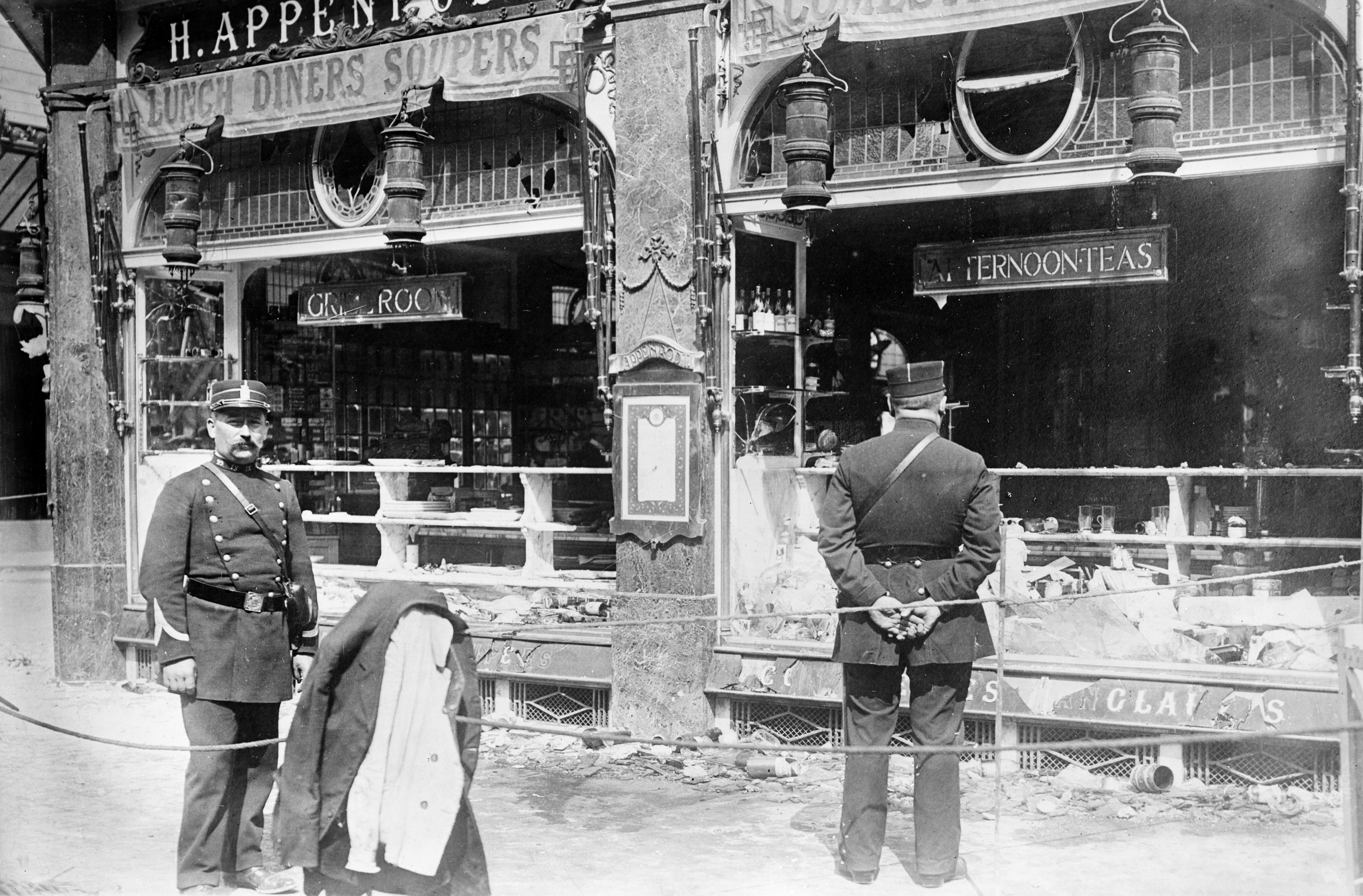
The facade of the Appenrodt tea house on Boulevard des Italiens, vandalized.

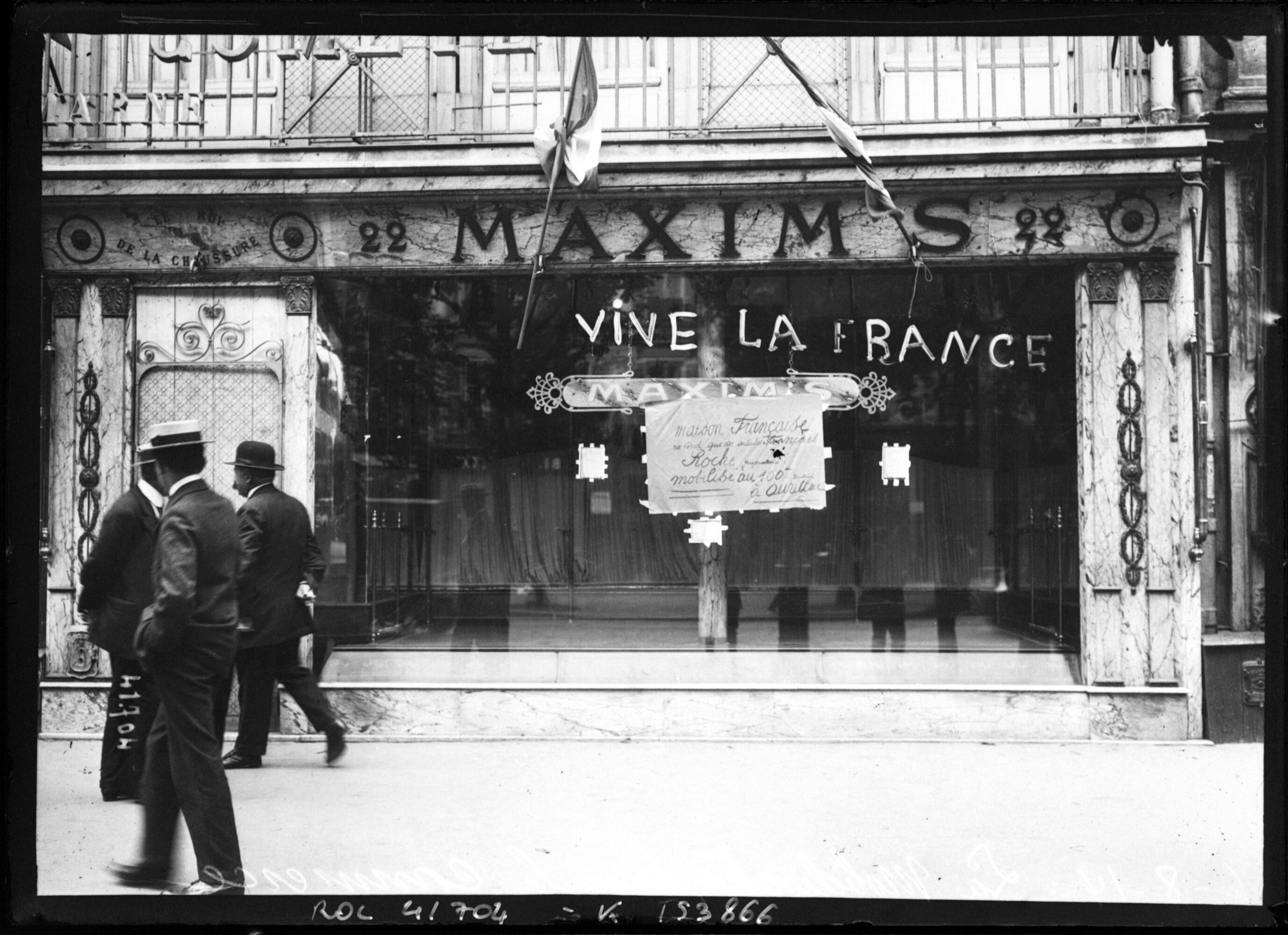
Poster for Maxim's store (a shoemaker): "Vive la France; French company, sells only French products, Roche, owner, mobilized in Aurillac".

This commitment, which was measured if resolute, was not incompatible with displays of patriotic enthusiasm in the streets, whether in the form of parades, crowds or military songs; nor did it prevent nationalist and xenophobic outbursts, notably the looting of stores with Germanic names (on the night of August 2 to 3, 1914, and again the following day, the Maggi dairy stores, although Swiss-branded, were looted. The same company's laboratory was set on fire; the Pschorr tavern on boulevard de Strasbourg, the Appenrodt food store on rue des Italiens, the Muller brasserie on rue Thorel and the Klein boutique on boulevard des Italiens were ransacked); the black veil was removed from the Strasbourg statue on place de la Concorde, etc.). This catharsis continued in the days that followed, with, for example, the renaming of rue de Berlin to rue de Liège on August 15 (in tribute to the Belgian defenders of the siege of Liège), avenue d'Allemagne to avenue Jean-Jaurès on August 19 (following a petition from the avenue's residents) and the homonym metro stations (Liège and Jaurès), the café viennois was renamed the café liégeois, berlingots became "parigots", German shepherds became Belgian shepherds and eau de Cologne became "eau de Pologne".

However, these collective manifestations of intense patriotic or even nationalist fervor were very much in the minority, confined to a few towns: as Stéphane Audoin-Rouzeau and Annette Becker point out, the motivation of rural populations (the majority in France) was clearly distinct from, but not contradictory to, a certain urban enthusiasm, "the leading edge of a general consent centered on resignation and acceptance - sometimes overwhelm - and then the growing resolution of the majority".

=== Sacred union ===
Military and political leaders were worried about the possible refusal to obey by civilians called up as reservists: they feared that the number of insoumis (deserters) would be significant, and that pacifist demonstrations would take place. Several opposition unions and political parties, notably the CGT and SFIO, had taken anti-militarist stances before the crisis broke out, and were planning a general strike (the refusal to obey mobilization orders) to prevent the outbreak of conflict. On July 29 and 30, SFIO leader Jean Jaurès was in Brussels for a meeting of the bureau of the Second International and a meeting with German socialist leaders, with the aim of coordinating their pacifist actions. Faced with these expected difficulties, the French Ministry of the Interior had planned for the systematic arrest of anti-militarist leaders in the event of mobilization: the Carnet B was to provide a list of 2,500 individuals "whose attitude and actions may be likely to disturb order and hinder the smooth running of mobilization services".).

However, the surge of patriotism and the assassination of Jaurès in Paris on July 31 led the Left Party to rally to the "Sacred Union" called for by President Poincaré in his speech on August 4. The CGT announced that it was putting its Paris premises on rue de la Grange-aux-Belles at the disposal of the Army Medical Corps. Léon Jouhaux, General Secretary of the CGT, proclaimed at Jaurès's funeral: "In the name of the trade unions, in the name of all those workers who have already joined their regiments, and in the name of those, including myself, who will be leaving tomorrow, I declare that we are going to the battlefield with the determination to repel the aggressor." As a result of these reactions, Interior Minister Louis Malvy instructed prefects not to use Carnet B, even though a few arrests were made in the Nord and Pas-de-Calais regions. The SFIO voted for the war loans, then joined the government in the reshuffle of August 26, gaining the Ministries of War and Foreign Affairs.

French: « La France vient d'être l'objet d'une agression brutale et préméditée qui est un insolent défi au droit des gens. Avant qu'une déclaration de guerre nous eut encore été adressée […] notre territoire a été violé. […] L'Allemagne a déclaré subitement la guerre à la Russie, elle a envahi le territoire du Luxembourg, elle a outrageusement insulté la noble nation belge, notre voisine et notre amie, et elle a essayé de nous surprendre traîtreusement en pleine conversation diplomatique. […] Dans la guerre qui s'engage, la France aura pour elle le droit […]. Elle sera héroïquement défendue par tous ses fils, dont rien ne brisera devant l'ennemi l'union sacrée et qui sont aujourd'hui fraternellement assemblés dans une même indignation contre l'agresseur et dans une même foi patriotique. Elle est fidèlement secondée par la Russie, son alliée; elle est soutenue par la loyale amitié de l'Angleterre. Et déjà de tous les points du monde civilisé viennent à elle les sympathies et les vœux. Car elle représente aujourd'hui, une fois de plus, devant l'univers, la liberté, la justice et la raison. Haut les cœurs et vive la France ! »

["France has just been the object of a brutal and premeditated aggression which is an insolent challenge to the people's rights. Before a declaration of war had even been addressed to us [...] our territory had been violated. [...] Germany suddenly declared war on Russia, invaded the territory of Luxembourg, outrageously insulted the noble Belgian nation, our neighbor and friend, and tried to treacherously surprise us in the midst of a diplomatic conversation. [...]

In the war that is about to begin, France will have the right [...]. She will be heroically defended by all her sons, whose sacred union can never be broken before the enemy, and who are today fraternally united in the same indignation against the aggressor and in the same patriotic faith. It is faithfully supported by Russia, its ally; it is backed by the loyal friendship of England. Sympathy and good wishes are already pouring in from all corners of the civilized world. For she represents today, once again, before the universe, liberty, justice and reason. Cheer up and long live France!]

— Raymond Poincaré, Message to the Chambers, read by Prime Minister René Viviani on August 4, 1914.

== Proceedings ==
The mobilization of 1914 was divided into three periods: the covering period (August 2 to 7), during which reservists were called up under the protection of covering troops; the concentration period (August 8 to 13), during which active and reserve troops were moved to the frontier; and the start of the period of major operations (August 14 to 18), during which territorial troops, fleets, and logistics were put in place.

=== Reservists recalled ===
Not all men were mobilized at the same time, but gradually, depending on their status. The mandatory date of arrival at the depot (indicated in days after the first day of mobilization) appeared on the mobilization booklet (a double sheet) attached by staples to the back cover of the military record booklet, which each man had to keep for his 28 years of military service (three years in the active service, eleven in the reserve, seven in the territorial service and seven in the territorial reserve), including during his travels, and even if he lived abroad.

The 200,000 men of the Territorial Reserve assigned to guarding transport routes were mobilized on the eve of the first day of mobilization (i.e. August 1), to protect important railroads and engineering structures close to their homes (usually less than ten kilometers away, or 6.2 miles).

The 880,000 men (Note: Peacetime manpower figures vary according to the men taken into account. The figure of 817,000 provided by MP Louis Marin includes the 766,000 troops in the armed service and the 51,000 in the auxiliary service, excluding indigenous troops and all officers. The total given by Naërt et al. 1936, p. 54 for August 1, 1914 is 882,907 men, including 686,993 in metropolitan France, 62,598 in Algeria-Tunisia, 81,750 in Morocco and 51,566 auxiliaries.) in the active service, i.e. classes 1911, 1912 and 1913 (born between 1891 and 1893, aged 21 to 23) (Note: This means that the men in class 1911 were drafted in October 1912, with a planned leave in November 1914, the latter not being applied given the state of war. They were demobilized in August 1919 (after eight years in uniform), and released from military service in September 1939. In the navy, some mobilized men from Black Sea units were not discharged until after 1920 (i.e. after more than nine years of continuous service).) were already in depots and barracks. They were joined by the 2,200,000 men in the reserve, i.e. classes 1900 to 1910 (born between 1880 and 1890, aged 24 to 34); then by the 700,000 men in the territorial reserve, i.e. classes 1893 to 1899 (born between 1873 and 1879, aged 35 to 41); the territorial reserve, i.e. classes 1887 to 1892, was not immediately mobilized (it would be incorporated from the youngest from August 16).

The transportation of all these reservists and territorials from their homes to their assignment depots ("mobilization centers") was mainly by rail, hence the first phase, known as "mobilization", was a vast crossroads of 10,000 passenger trains (including 3,262 trains on the PLM network, 3,121 trains on the Northern, 1,500 trains on the PO and 1,334 trains in the Eastern) crossing metropolitan France in all directions and transporting mobilized men in civilian clothes free of charge. "Men who were drafted were advised to set off with two shirts, one pair of boxer shorts, two handkerchiefs and a good pair of shoes; to have their hair cut and to take a day's supply of food with them." On August 1, the railroads received the general mobilization order; a ministerial decree stated that from August 2, 1914, the railroads were under military control. Immediately, the railways prepared wagons for troop transport.

The youngest reservists (classes 1910, 1909 and 1908) completed the active units, and must join the depots on the 2nd and 3rd days of mobilization, i.e. Monday August 3 and Tuesday August 4. Slightly older reservists (classes 1907, 1906, 1905 and 1904) formed reserve units (supervised by a few officers and men from the active service) and must be present at the depot from the 3rd, 4th or 5th day, depending on the unit, i.e. from Tuesday August 4 or Thursday August 6. As for the oldest reservists (classes 1903 and 1902), they must theoretically remain at the depot to replace future losses. Territorial reservists were called up a little later. In addition, there were 71,000 voluntary enlistees, who were called up early (classes 1914 onwards: The Law of Three years authorized voluntary enlistment for the duration of the war from the age of 17), re-enlisted (some veterans of the 1870 war) or were foreigners (26,000 men, including Alsatians-Lorrains, Poles and Italians, who were not all enrolled in the Foreign Legion).

Departure of the first mobilized in Paris

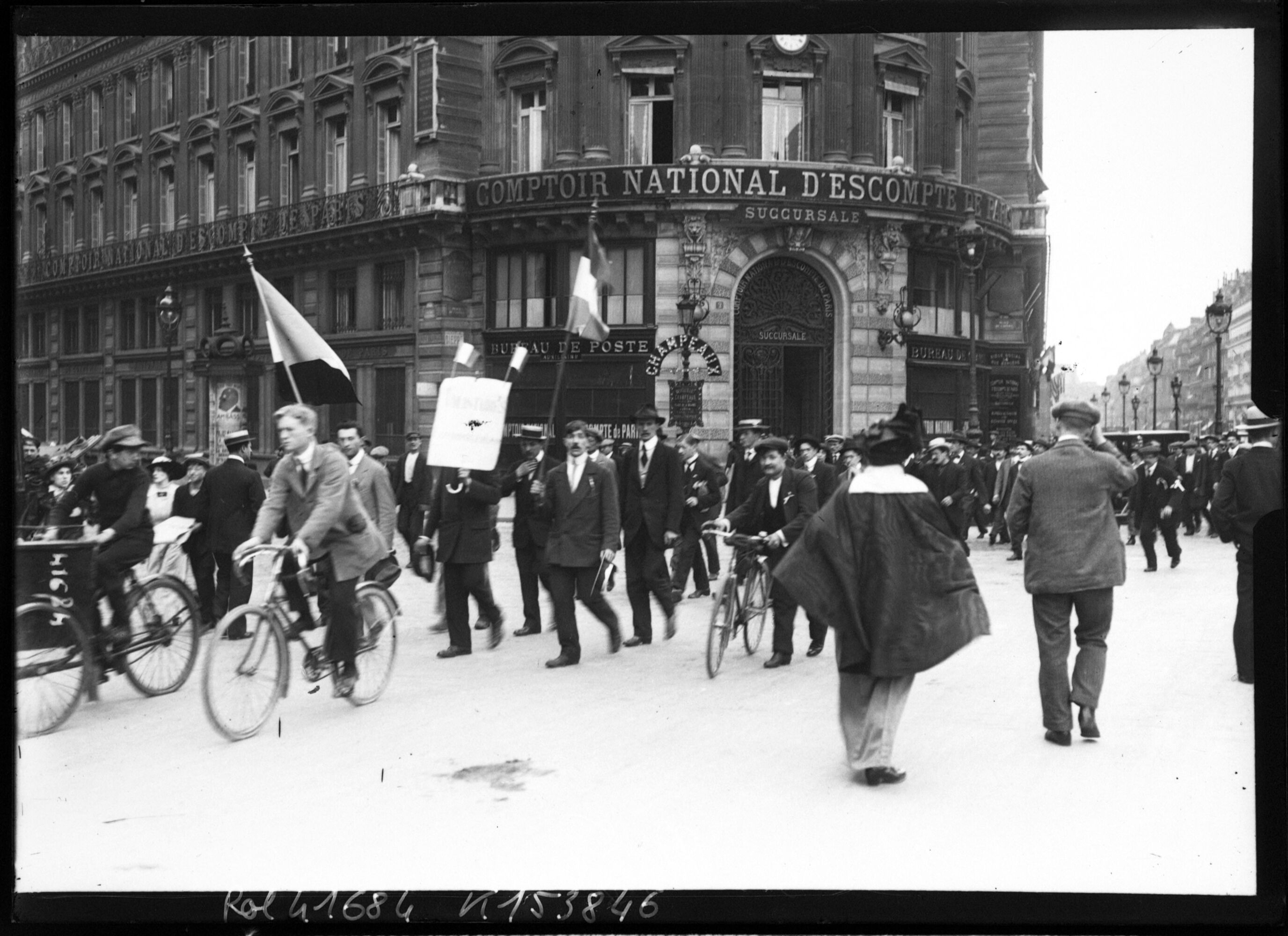
Parade of mobilized men on the Place de l'Opéra.

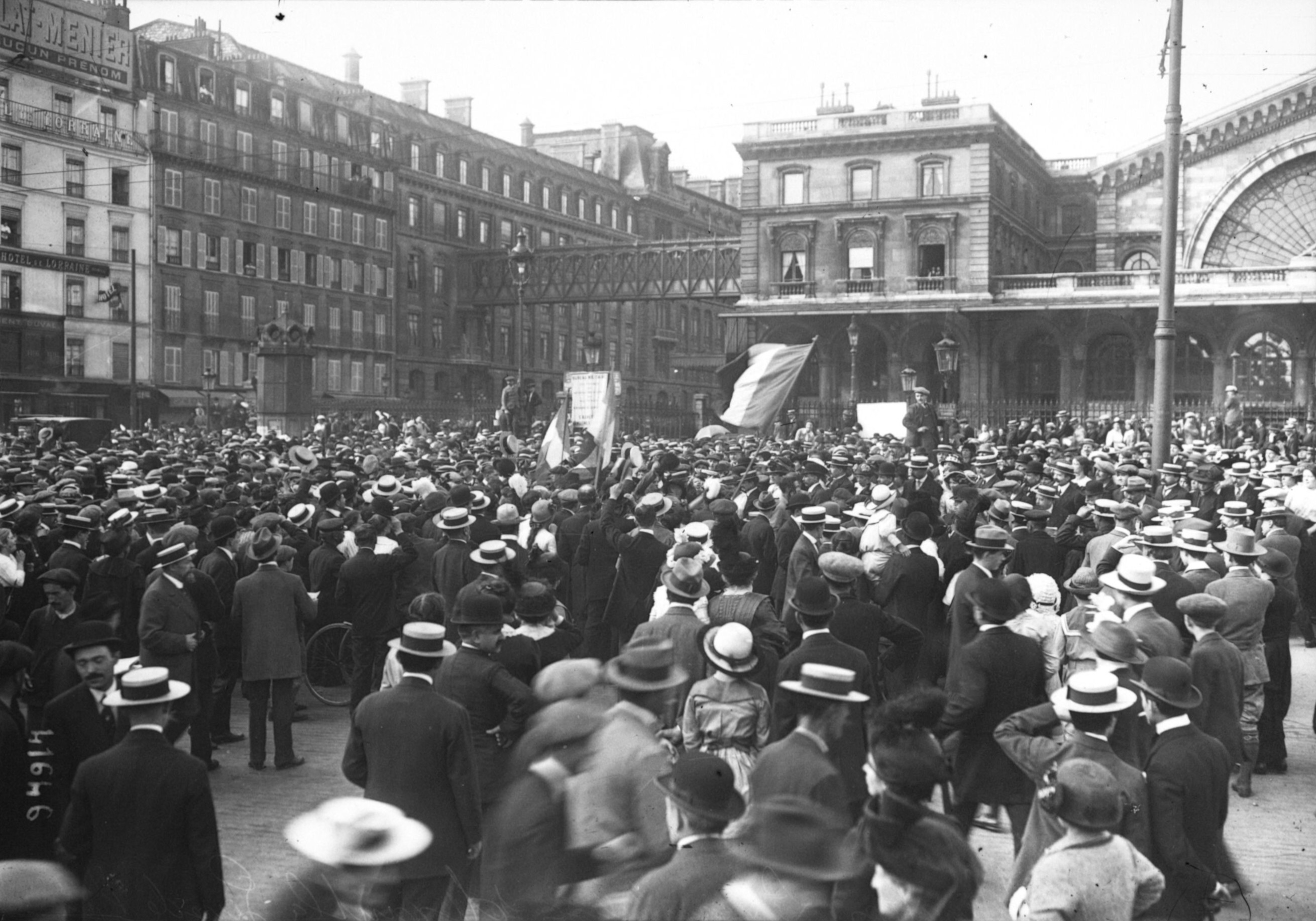
Crowd of mobilized men at the Gare de l'Est.

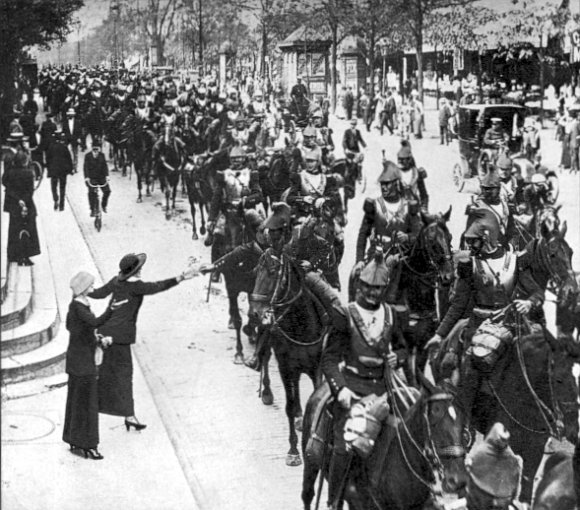
Regiment of cuirassiers up one of the boulevards.

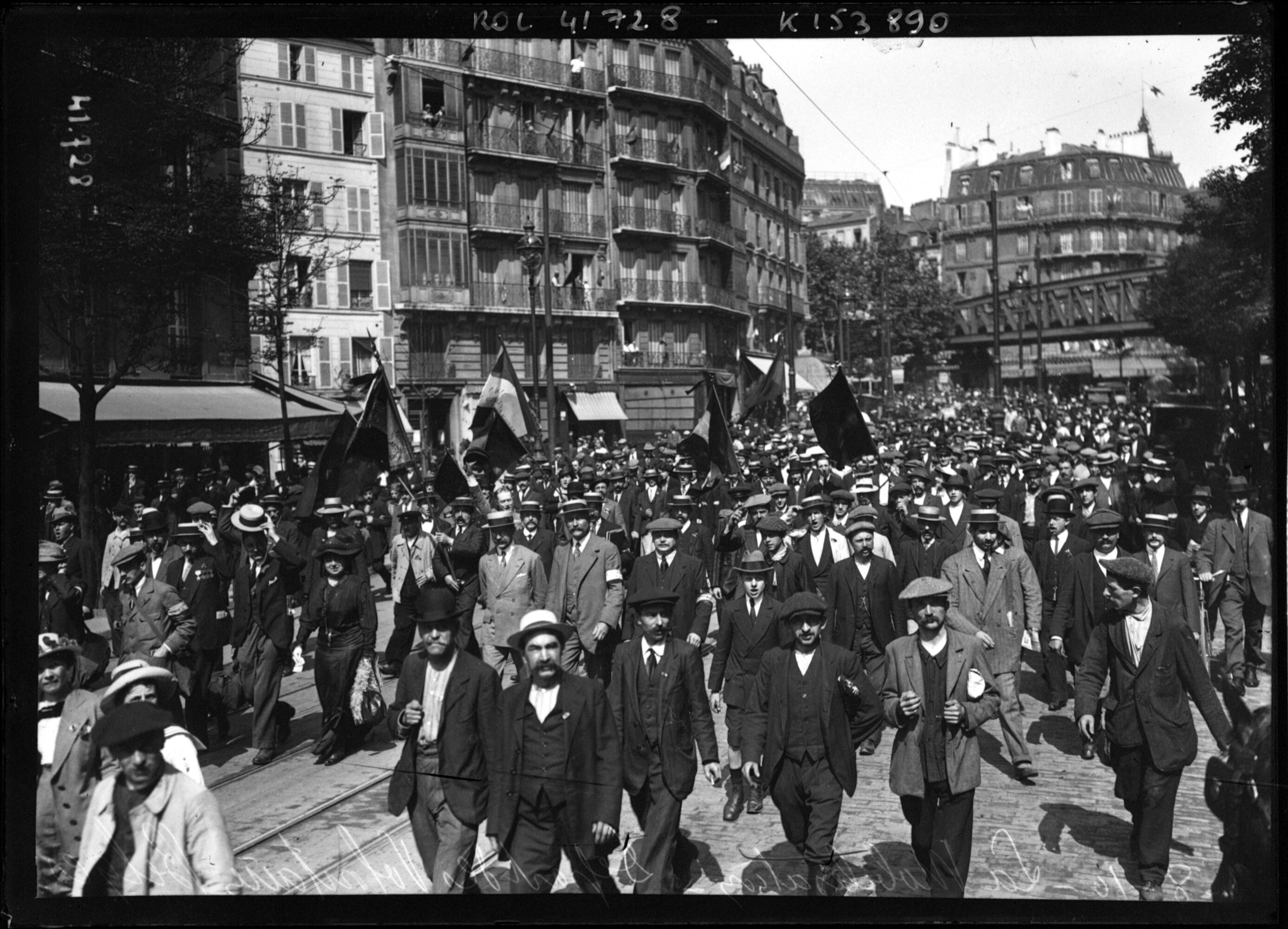
Parade before the departure of Belgian volunteers by train, August 9, 1914.

The École spéciale militaire de Saint-Cyr was closed at the start of the mobilization, and all its students were assigned to active service regiments during the August days, most of them becoming sub-lieutenants by October (the "Montmirail" class of 1912–1914 and the "Croix du Drapeau" class of 1913–1914). As for candidates for the 1914 Saint-Cyr entrance examination, who had just taken the written exam in June, their oral exams were abolished: all those eligible were declared successful on August 4 and immediately sent to the depots, where, after four months of training, they became sub-lieutenants or non-commissioned officers (this class of 1914 was dubbed "the Great Revenge" in January 1915). The École Polytechnique was also closed for mobilization, and all students from the class of 1913 were transferred to the artillery or engineering corps as sub-lieutenants. Students from the École normale supérieure, the École forestière de Nancy and the École des mines de Saint-Étienne who had been found fit were transferred to the infantry, those from the École centrale des arts et manufactures and the École nationale supérieure des mines joined the artillery, and those from the École des ponts et chaussées were assigned to the engineering corps (as provided for by the law of March 21, 1905 or Law of Three Years), while classes resumed for the few who had been exempted. Second-year students at the École navale left with the rank of second petty officer of the fleet, but kept their student uniforms.

The number of draft dodgers (Note: "Any serviceman at home, recalled to active duty, who, except in the case of force majeure, has not arrived at his destination on the day set by the regularly notified route order, is considered to be insubordinate, after a period of thirty days, and punishable by the penalties laid down in article 230 of the Code of Military Justice.") was lower (1.5%) than forecast (13%): the gendarmerie brigades only had to reduce small underground groups in the Loire department and a few self-mutilations (of the left index finger or calf) were lamented; the men responsible for the incidents (mostly related to drinking) were transferred to disciplinary companies. The 1st cuirassier regiment was even kept in Paris for three days in the École Militaire barracks as a precautionary measure, "for reasons of domestic policy", as reinforcements for the Republican Guard. As for rebels and deserters prior to mobilization, they were offered amnesty if they surrendered voluntarily.

=== Clothing and equipment ===
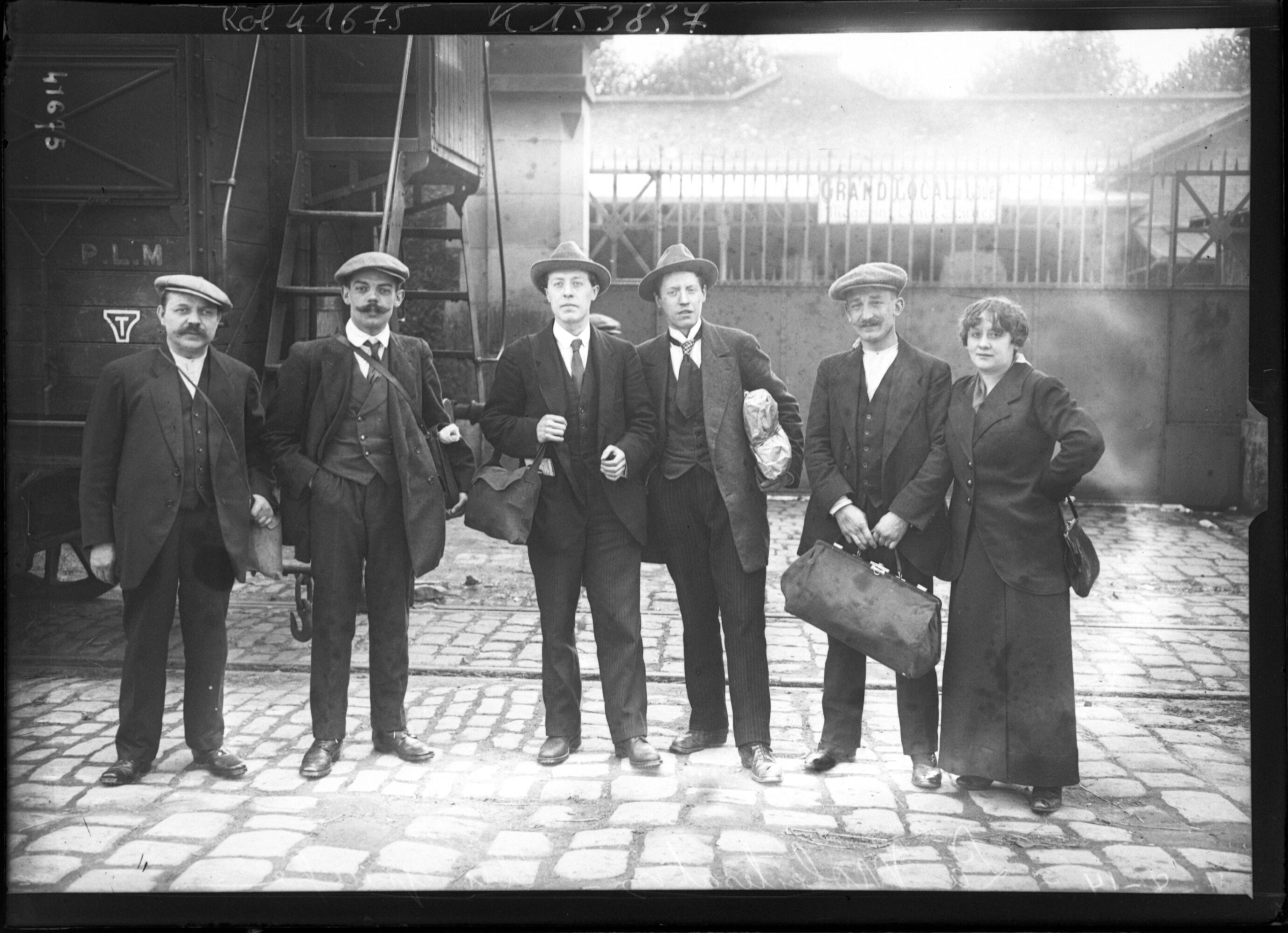
Group of five mobilized soldiers at a railway station, before their departure on August 4, 1914.

From August 1 to 15, 2,887,000 men were drafted, then 1,099,000 from August 16 to September 30, giving an estimated total of 3,986,000 men (the 1911 census announced a population of 39.7 million in France, including 19.5 million men, of whom 12.6 million were fitted). In September and October 1914, all those discharged and exempted from the 1887 to 1914 classes were enumerated and then recalled by the draft boards.

Mobilization quadrupled the troops: the crowd had to be dressed in uniform (kepi, jacket, overcoat, pants, suspenders, shirts, tie, underpants, gaiters and socks) and work boots; equip it with a backpack, a bag, a canister, a comb, two handkerchiefs, a grease tin, four brushes, a bar of soap, a sewing kit (scissors, a spool of thread, a thimble, needles and a collection of buttons), a pack of bandages (a feather cushion, a gauze compress, a cotton strip and two safety pins), a mess tin, a spoon, a fork, a quarter of a litre, twelve loaves of war bread (1.5 kg, for two days), a tin of canned food (500 g of salted beef or condensed soup), sachets of small foodstuffs (200 g of rice or dried vegetables, 72 g of instant coffee, 64 g of sugar and 40 g of salt), a belt, three cartridge belts and a sword-bayonet holder; for each squad, four large bowls, four cooking pots, two canvas buckets, a coffee grinder, two distribution bags and tools (picks, axes, hacksaws and shovels). Each man wears around his neck an oval aluminum identity plate (with surname, first name and class on one side, and regional subdivision and regimental number on the other), which is only issued in wartime. Stores were emptied for reservists, so the territorials were often dressed and equipped with old clothes and old-fashioned weaponry.

In two weeks, the French army went from 686 to 1,636 infantry battalions, from 365 to 596 cavalry squadrons, from 855 to 1,527 artillery batteries and from 191 to 528 engineer units. Its structure grew from 54 divisions in metropolitan France (including ten cavalry divisions, not counting units in the French North Africa) in peacetime to 94 divisions (46 active, 25 reserve, 13 territorial and 10 cavalry) standing on the ready. In addition, there were 21 army squadrons (each with eight aircraft), two cavalry squadrons, five airships, four companies of local balloonists, and 212 sections of the automotive service (transporting troops, equipment, medical supplies and fresh meat). Departure for the border was on schedule, with the unit theoretically fully manned and equipped.

=== Mobilization coverage ===
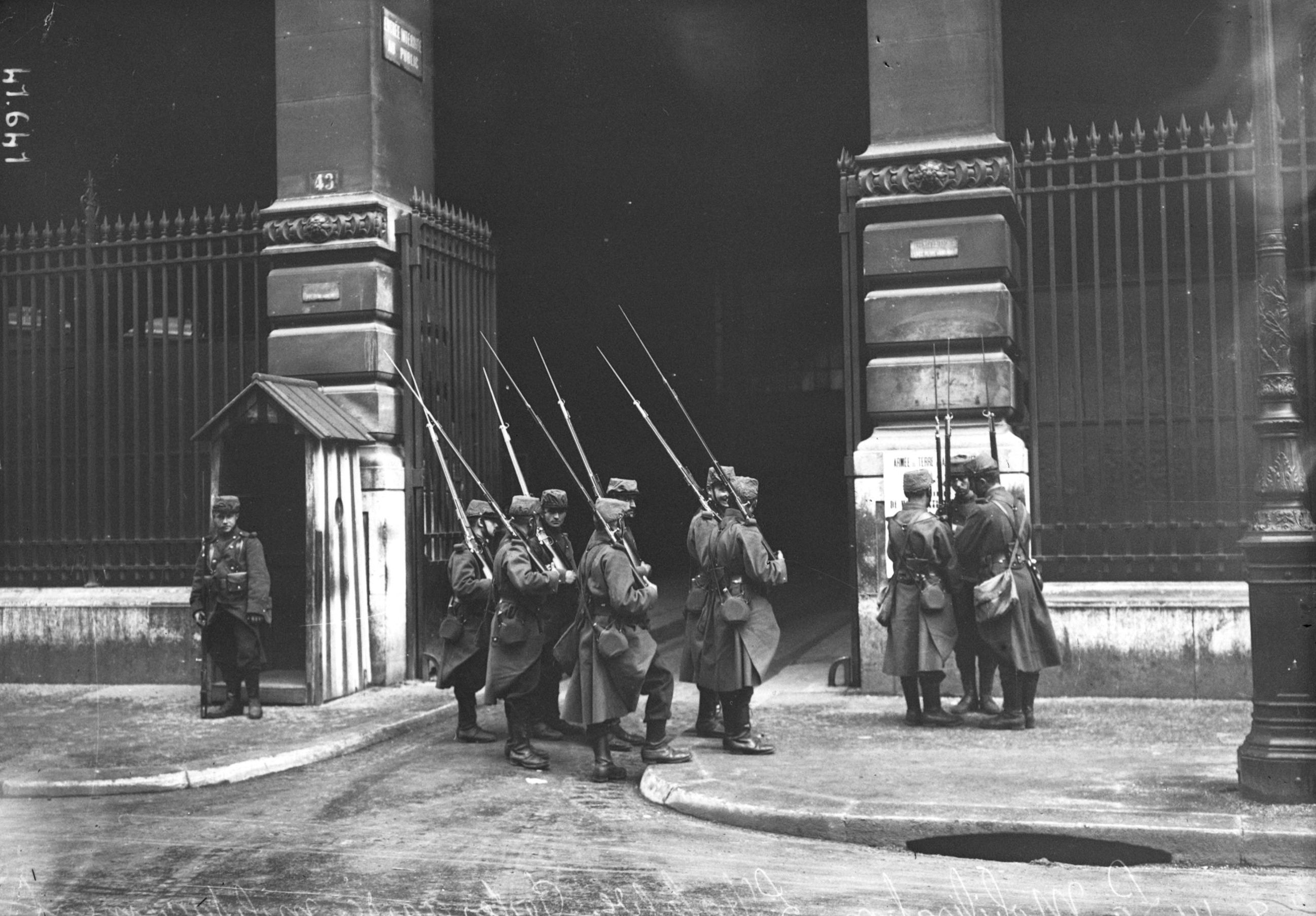
One of the first preventive measures was to protect the means of communication: here, the Hôtel des Postes (a post office) in the rue du Louvre, Paris, on August 2, 1914.

As early as July 25, 1914, all general officers and chefs de corps (unit commanders) were recalled and their leave withdrawn and on the 26th, all units on leave were ordered to return to their barracks. (Note: For example, a 152nd regiment battalion of 712 men carried out "reconnaissance marches in the Vosges" from July 16 to 26, 1914. This regiment carried such training maneuvers annually, with companies simulating the interception of enemy units in the mountains. The order to return arrived at 1:30 a.m. on the 27th, prompting the march from Vagney to Gérardmer, where the battalion arrived at 6:45 a.m.) Then, On the evening of the 27th, troops on leave from the five army corps on the border were recalled, and these corps applied the "dispositif restreint de sécurité" (restricted safety system) (measures to protect communication routes, especially engineering structures). In the middle of the night of the 27th to the 28th, the Ministry of War ordered the recall of those on leave from the interior corps. On the 29th, the Minister ordered the guarding of fortified structures, military establishments and wireless stations in the six frontier corps (1st in Maubeuge, 2nd in the Ardennes, 6th in Verdun, 20th in Toul, 21st in Épinal and 7th corps in Belfort). On the morning of July 31, 1914, the five eastern army corps were ordered to carry out a "full mobilization exercise" (deployment of active units), but ten kilometers behind the border (by order of the government); the governors of the four eastern positions were now ordered to launch defense work (digging trenches, laying barbed wire and setting up batteries).

At 6 p.m. on August 1, the colonels of the regiments at stake received the telegram "Faites partir troupes de couverture" ("Send out covering troops"), leading to the deployment by train or on foot of units from all five corps and the recall of border reservists, but still ten kilometers behind the border. The 7th Corps (temporarily including the 8th Cavalry Division) deployed in the "Higher Vosges sector" (from Belfort to Gérardmer), the 21st Corps (including the 6th Cavalry Division) in the High Meurthe sector (from Fraize to Avricourt), the 20th corps (with the 2nd Cavalry Division) in the Low Meurthe sector (from Avricourt to Dieulouard), the 6th corps (including the 7th Cavalry Division) in the southern Woëvre (from Pont-à-Mousson to Conflans) and the 2nd corps (with the 4th Cavalry Division) in the northern Woëvre (from Conflans to Givet). These covering positions were commanded by generals from the various frontier army corps, under the direct command of the General-in-Chief until the 5th day, when they came under the orders of army commanders. Ahead of the "big ones" several groups were placed, each composed of a battalion and a squadron, with cavalry "scouts" supported by customs officers and forestry hunters further forward. Transport of the cover was completed on August 3, thanks to 538 trains; the three early-mobilization divisions were in place by August 5.

The navy was also involved in preventive measures. From July 25, leave-holders were recalled, reserve ships were reconditioned, munitions of war began to be loaded and schools closed. On July 29, the battleships concentrated in Toulon filled up with coal. On July 31, trawlers were requisitioned (to be used as auxiliary minesweepers) and port defenses were organized. On August 2, the general firing order for the ships' boilers (several hours of heating are needed to build up sufficient steam pressure) is given for 10:15 pm. On August 3, at 4:50 a.m., the squadrons set sail from Toulon to protect links with North Africa.

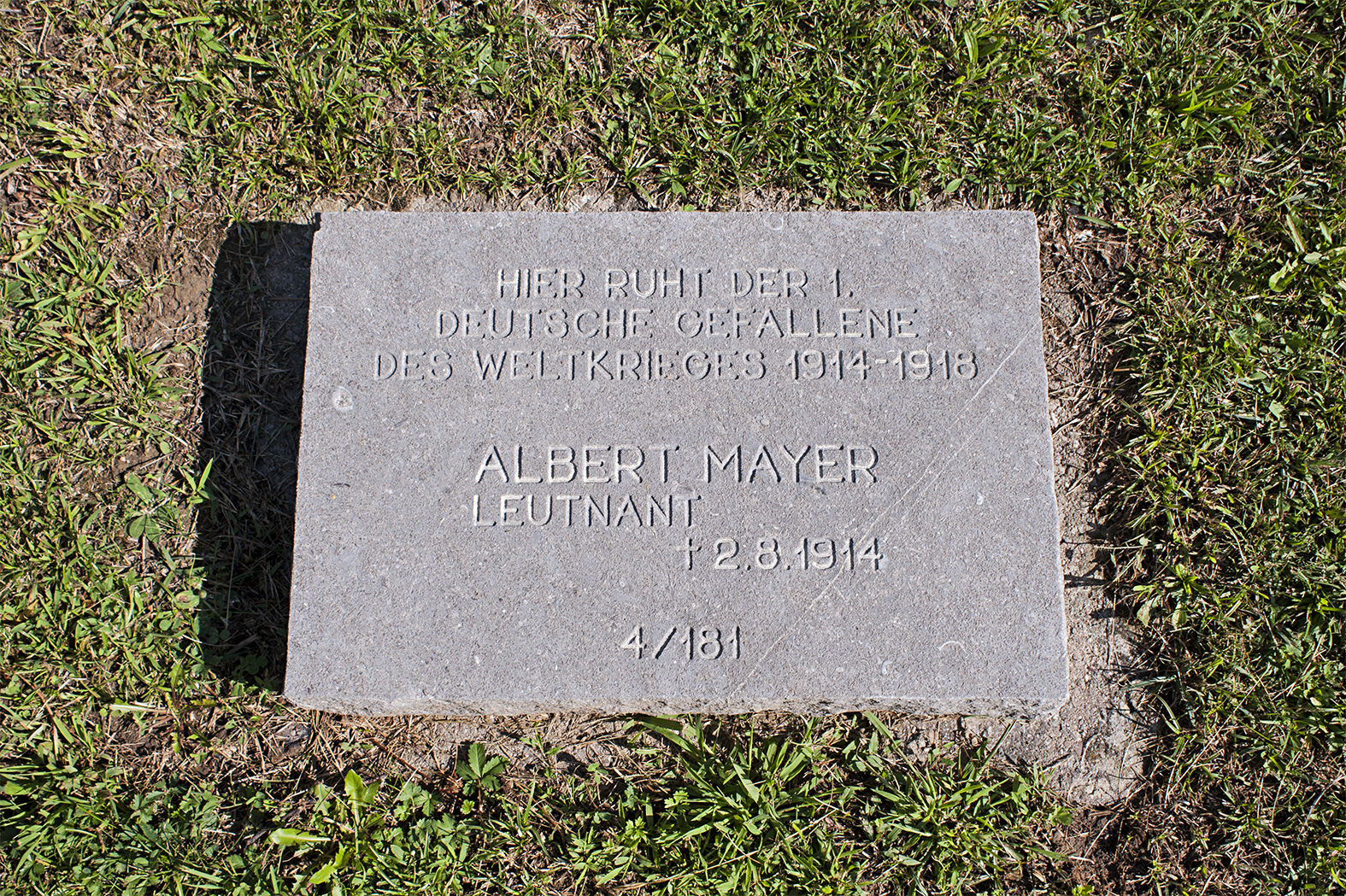
Grave of the first German casualty of 1914: Lieutenant Mayer, buried at the Deutscher Soldatenfriedhof (German military cemetery) in Illfurth, near Mulhouse.

The first border incident occurred on the 2nd of August: a German patrol from the Jäger-Regiment zu Pferde Nr. 5 (5e regiment of cavalrymen, stationed at Mulhouse) encountered a French squad from the 44th infantry regiment (from Montbéliard), stationed there for surveillance, at Joncherey near Delle (in the Territoire de Belfort): the exchange of fire killed the two commanders, French corporal Jules André Peugeot (21) and German Albert Mayer (22), who became the first to be killed in either country, even before the declaration of war. Further German reconnaissance near Longwy and Lunéville verified the French positions. On the morning of the 2nd, the Chief of the General Staff sent a note to the Minister of War: "We have had to abandon positions which were of some importance to the development of our campaign plan. Eventually, we will be obliged to regain these positions, which will not be without sacrifice." Almost immediately, he obtained "absolute freedom of movement to carry out his plans, even if this means crossing the German border". On August 3, Joffre called a meeting of his five army commanders in the offices of the Ministry of War, before leaving for his newly created headquarters in Vitry-le-François.

=== Concentration ===
==== Transportation problems ====
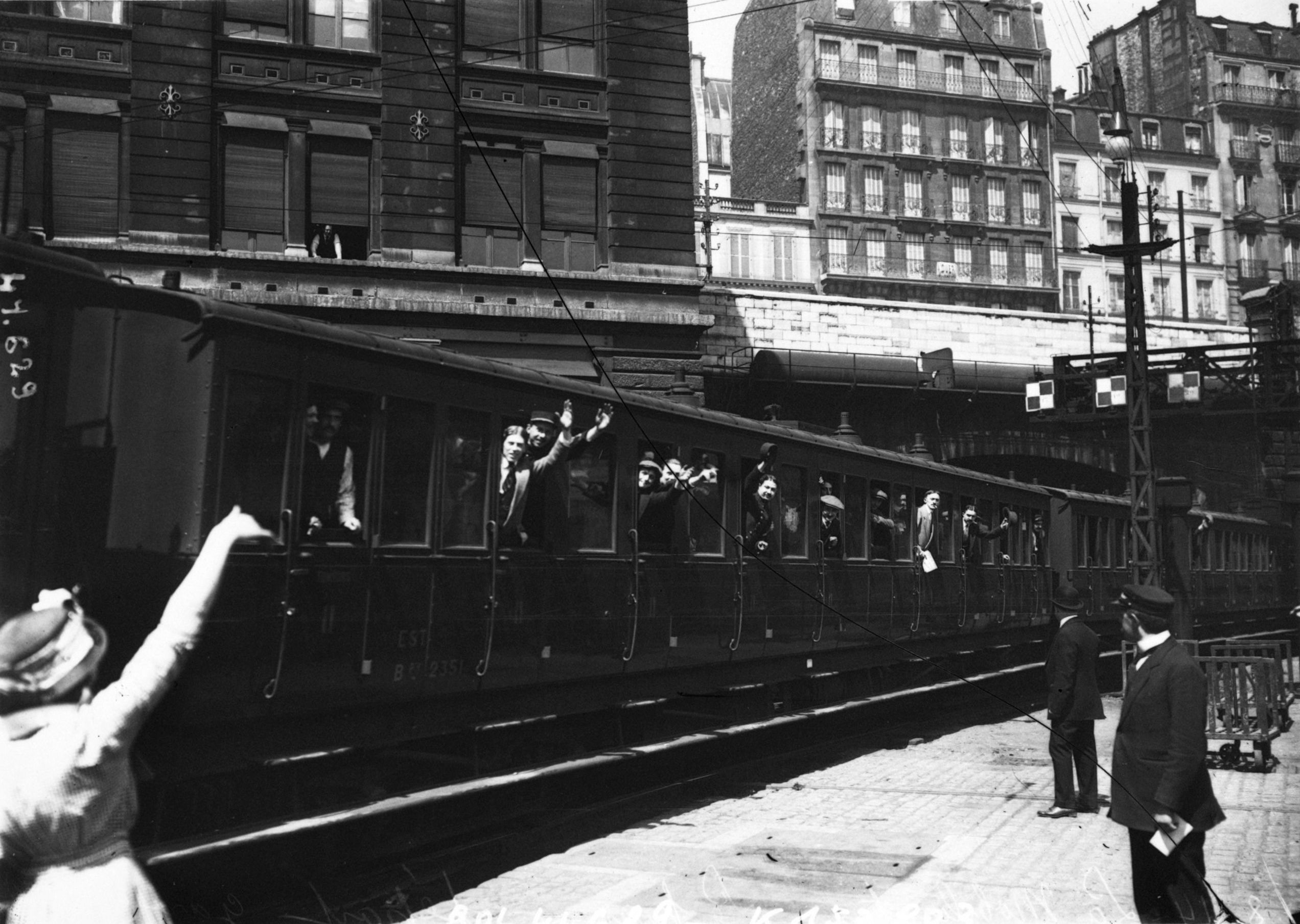
Departure of a train of mobilized soldiers from Gare de Paris-Est, August 2, 1914.

The concentration of almost the entire French army corps (minus the 680,000 men still in depots, the 210,000 men guarding the communication routes, the 821,400 men assigned to strongholds, the 65,000 men at sea and the units deployed in the colonies) near the Franco-German border was carried out in 1914 by rail. This huge move, organized by the General Staff, was made possible by the requisitioning of the railroads (Nord, Est, PO, PLM and Midi), which lost all autonomy (except financial) on the evening of July 31. This requisition was total: personnel, installations and all equipment were under army control. Between August 6 and 18, the concentration of the French army required 4,035 trains running on the ten lines organized by the military. Local companies were also affected by the requisition.

A few events disrupted the concentration: the first took place on August 7, when an accident at Brienne blocked the E line (from Toulouse) and traffic was redirected to the D line (from Bordeaux); but on August 8, a second incident on the saturated D line caused delays to the landings of the 12th and 17th corps. On August 10, the train carrying the headquarters of the 55th reserve division was hit at Sompuis at around 5:30 a.m. by one of the 313th regiment's trains: the collision killed six and injured 25; as for the collision, the officers' wagon was "smashed to pieces", injuring seven, including General Leguay; convoys on the F line were delayed by twenty hours. There were also wagon fires and a number of accidents: for example, on August 6, a soldier from the 61st infantry regiment in Privas "perched on the brakeman's cab of a wagon hit a structure and was killed outright" before the Givors-Canal station.

As for the French Army of Africa, it provided two divisions from Algeria and Tunisia, as well as a division taken from the Moroccan occupation corps (Note: The Moroccan occupation corps numbered 82,000 men in 1914, the majority of whom remained in the country.) as planned; but these three divisions, made up of regiments of Zouaves, Algerian Tirailleurs, Legionnaires, Spahis and African Chasseurs, were vulnerable during their crossing. On August 4, the Kaiserliche Navy cruisers SMS Goeben and SMS Breslau bombarded Philippeville and Bône, before fleeing as the British ships approached. The French crossing was uneventful after this surprise, with the two Algerian divisions landing in Sète and Marseille, while the Moroccan division ("division de marche d'infanterie coloniale du Maroc") did so in Bordeaux. They were then transported by rail, requiring 239 trains.

==== Army creation ====
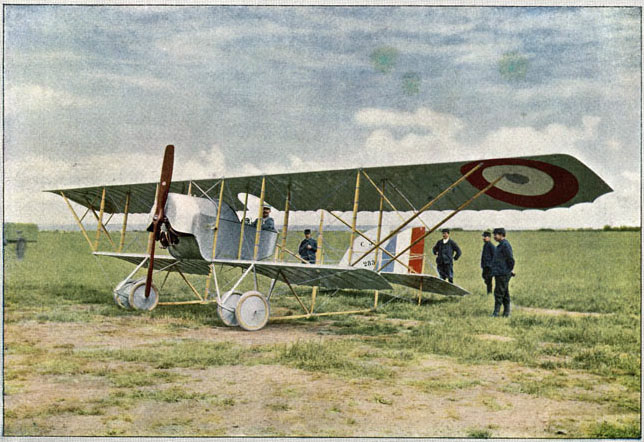
Military aeronautics in 1914 was no more than a subdivision of the army, with 216 aircraft grouped into squadrons. There were also a few large airships and tethered balloons. Here, a Caudron G.3.

The transport lines supplied the troops needed to form, from August 5 onwards, the five maneuver armies of Plan XVII, which foresaw a French offensive towards Elsaß-Lothringen (German Alsace-Lorraine) and the possibility of a meeting in the Belgian Ardennes. Three armies were thus massed in Lorraine and around Belfort: the 1st Army (commanded by General Dubail and comprising the 7th, 8th, 13th, 14th and 21st Corps) deployed on the slopes of the Vosges, relying on the fortified regions of Belfort and Épinal (its mission was to attack to the southeast towards Mulhouse and above all to the northeast towards Sarrebourg); the 2nd Army (General Castelnau: 9th, 15th, 16th, 18th and 20th corps) deployed on the Lorraine plateau, relying on the stronghold of Toul (its mission was to attack to the northeast towards Morhange); the 3rd army (general Ruffey: 4th, 5th and 6th corps) deployed in Woëvre, relying on the fortified town of Verdun (its more static mission was to guard the German fortifications at Metz-Thionville). In the event of a German violation of Belgian neutrality, a strong French left wing guarded the Ardennes massif: the 5th Army (General Lanrezac: 1st, 2nd, 3rd, 10th and 11th Corps) was deployed in the Ardennes department opposite the Stenay gap, with the 4th Army (General Langle de Cary: 12th and 17th Corps, as well as the Colonial Corps) in reserve astride the Argonne and in the Barrois, and the Cavalry Corps in reserve around Mézières.

Only the active divisions were placed in the front line, with the reserve divisions held back until they could be properly taken over and further trained. Four "groups of reserve divisions" were therefore concentrated behind the front line: the first group (58th, 63rd and 66th reserve divisions) around Vesoul (behind the 1st Army), the second group (59th, 68th and 70th divisions) around Nancy-Toul (at the disposal of the 2nd Army), the third group (54th, 55th and 56th divisions) around Verdun and Saint-Mihiel (at the disposal of the 3rd Army) and the fourth group (51st, 53rd and 69th divisions) around Vervins (behind the 5th Army). The commander-in-chief kept in general reserve the two divisions provided by the 19th corps (37th and 38th, from Algeria), the 44th active division (dispersed in the Alps, facing Italy), the southeastern reservists (the 64th, 65th, 74th and 75th reserve divisions, in the Alps), as well as the divisions assigned to the "mobile defense of the North-East" (57th at Belfort, 71st at Épinal, 72nd at Verdun and 73rd at Toul), while the Minister retained control of the 67th (at the Mailly camp) and the 61st and 62nd reserve divisions (in the entrenched camp of Paris).

The thirteen territorial infantry divisions were the last to be formed, and their concentration continued until August 19. Commanded by General Brugère, nine of these divisions were intended for maneuver, hence their name "territorial field divisions": the 91st at Draguignan within the Alps army (in case of an Italian threat); the 84th and 88th assigned to the entrenched camp of Paris (for mobile defense); the 81st and 82nd at Hazebrouck and Arras (in case of a German naval landing); the 87th concentrated near Cherbourg (for coastal protection); finally, the 90th and 92nd divisions placed at Perpignan and Bayonne to guard the Spanish border. The last four divisions, the 83rd, 85th, 86th and 89th, were garrisoned in the entrenched camp of Paris, with limited means of transport, hence their name of "territorial site divisions". As Italian and Spanish neutrality was confirmed at the beginning of August, and the British entry into the war secured the coasts, the field divisions were reassigned to the Northeast, with the exception of the 90th, which was sent to North Africa from August 12.

==== Modifications ====
The announcement that German troops had entered Luxembourg on the morning of August 2 confirmed to the French General Staff the hypothesis of a German attack attempting to overrun the French concentration by flanking through Belgium (invaded from the morning of August 4). On August 2, orders were therefore given to the French left wing to deploy in order to control the outlets of the Ardennes (this was a variant of Plan XVII): the 4th army, previously in reserve, was to be inserted between the 3rd and 5th armies from Sedan to Montmédy, the 5th army shifted a little further west from Hirson to Charleville, half of the 3rd army redeployed from Montmédy to Spincourt, while the cavalry corps was sent to provide cover and reconnaissance ahead of the 5th, in the Belgian Ardennes (the Belgian government gave the French permission to enter Belgium at 11 p.m. on August 4).

In addition to the French Army's battle corps, the British Expeditionary Force (commanded by Field Marshal John French: four infantry divisions and one cavalry division) was secretly foreseen in the French concentration plan. (Note: The landing of the British Expeditionary Force was planned by Major-General Henry Wilson, Director of Military Operations at the British War Office since 1910, who held secret discussions with the French General Staff. The transport plan for the "W Army" was drawn up in March 1913.) The British decision to send their small army to France was taken on August 5, 1914; and the decision to deploy it at Maubeuge only on August 9 (Secretary of State for War Kitchener preferred Amiens). From August 9 onwards, the various units were embarked in Southampton, Cork, Dublin and Belfast, arriving until August 17 in Le Havre, Rouen and Boulogne, before being transported (by the W railroad line, created for it) and deployed near Maubeuge, at the left end of the French line.

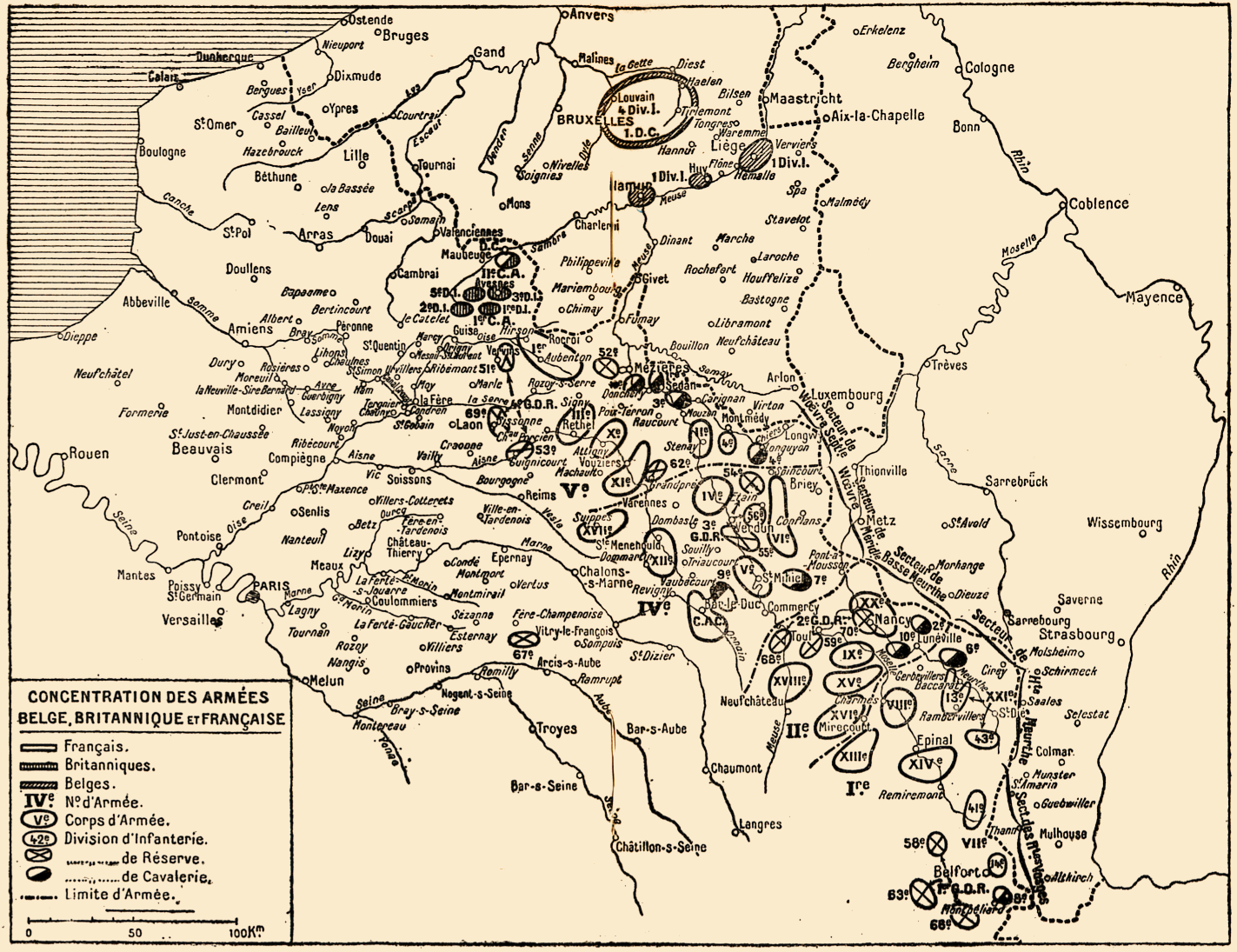
Map of the concentration of the Belgian, British and French armies in August 1914.

== Consequences ==
=== Restriction of freedoms ===
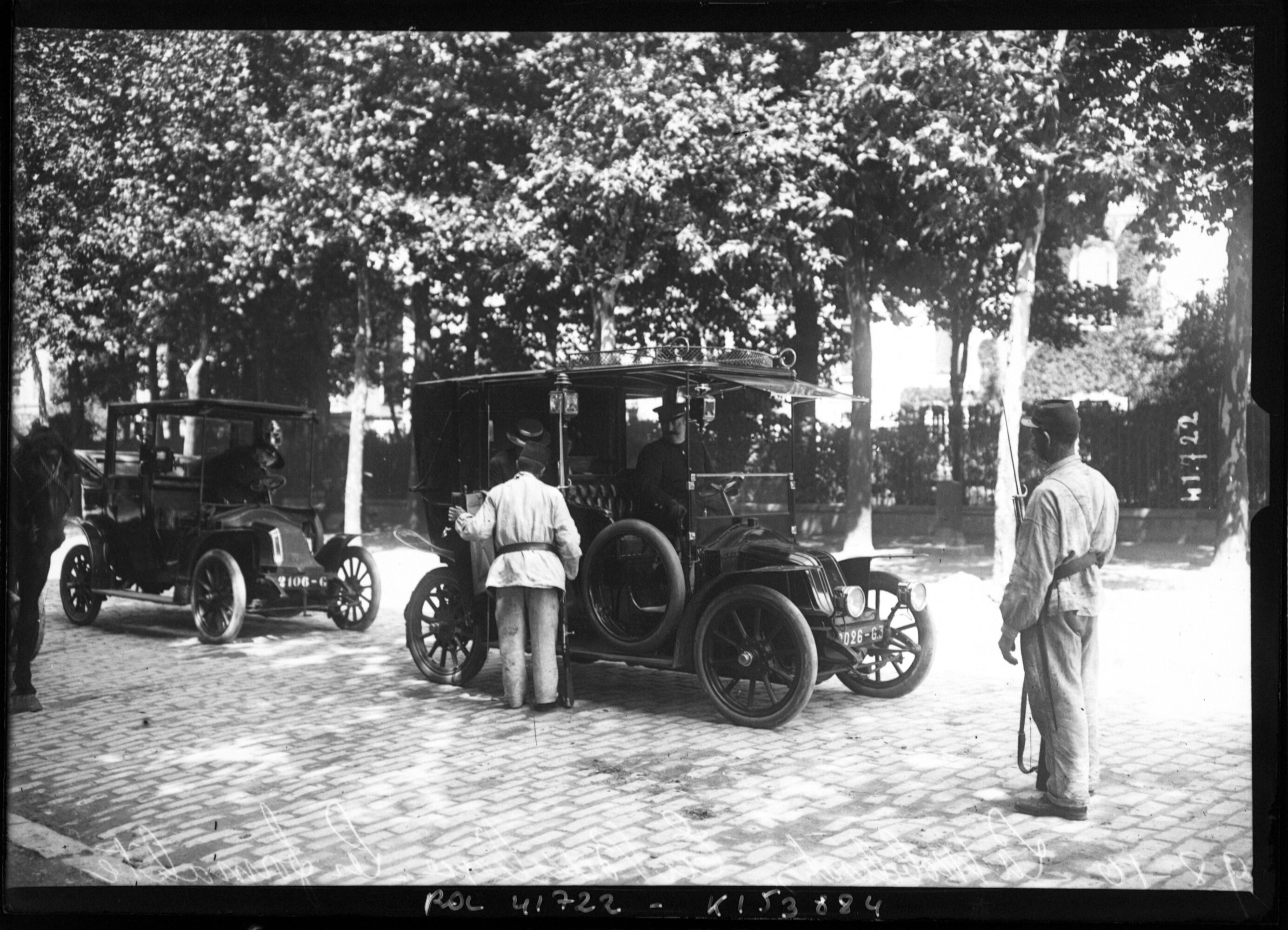
Identity checks for travelers leaving Paris by car, August 9.

A "state de siège" (state of emergency) was declared on August 2, 1914 (two days before receiving the German declaration of war) in all French departments (including Algeria) and maintained for the duration of the war. The proclamation of a state of emergency did not comply with the 1878 law on states of emergency: on the one hand, it should have set a limited duration (in months or, at worst, years), after which Parliament should have decided whether or not to renew it; on the other hand, Parliament should have continued to sit, instead of absenting itself, until January 1915, immediately after ratifying the state of emergency.

Mayors and prefects immediately lost their police powers to the military authorities, allowing the army to ban meetings, search homes and bring civilians before military tribunals (with highly simplified procedures and immediate execution of sentences). However, the General Headquarters remained accountable to the executive, which in turn was accountable to Parliament, for the duration of the state of siege - which was not lifted until November 1919, more than a year after the armistice.

German and Austro-Hungarian residents were evacuated from the North-East and from the strongholds; all foreigners were required to have a residence permit. In Paris, exceptional measures were taken: the gates of the fortified city walls were closed and guarded from 6 p.m. until 6 a.m.; by order of the Prefecture of Police on July 29, drinking establishments had to close at 8 p.m. and restaurants at 9 p.m.; dances were forbidden; most gas burners and electric streetlamps were switched off as part of a blackout.

Elections were suspended, as the majority of the electorate, including several deputies, (Note: 17 deputies are killed in action during their term of office. The first was Pierre Goujon, radical deputy for Ain and reserve sub-lieutenant in the 229th infantry regiment, who was shot in the head at Méhoncourt near Lunéville on August 25, 1914.) were in uniform (women and soldiers did not have the right to vote under the Third Republic) and part of the country was occupied. On August 2, the Senate and Chamber of Deputies were called into extraordinary session from the 4th to vote on a series of emergency laws.

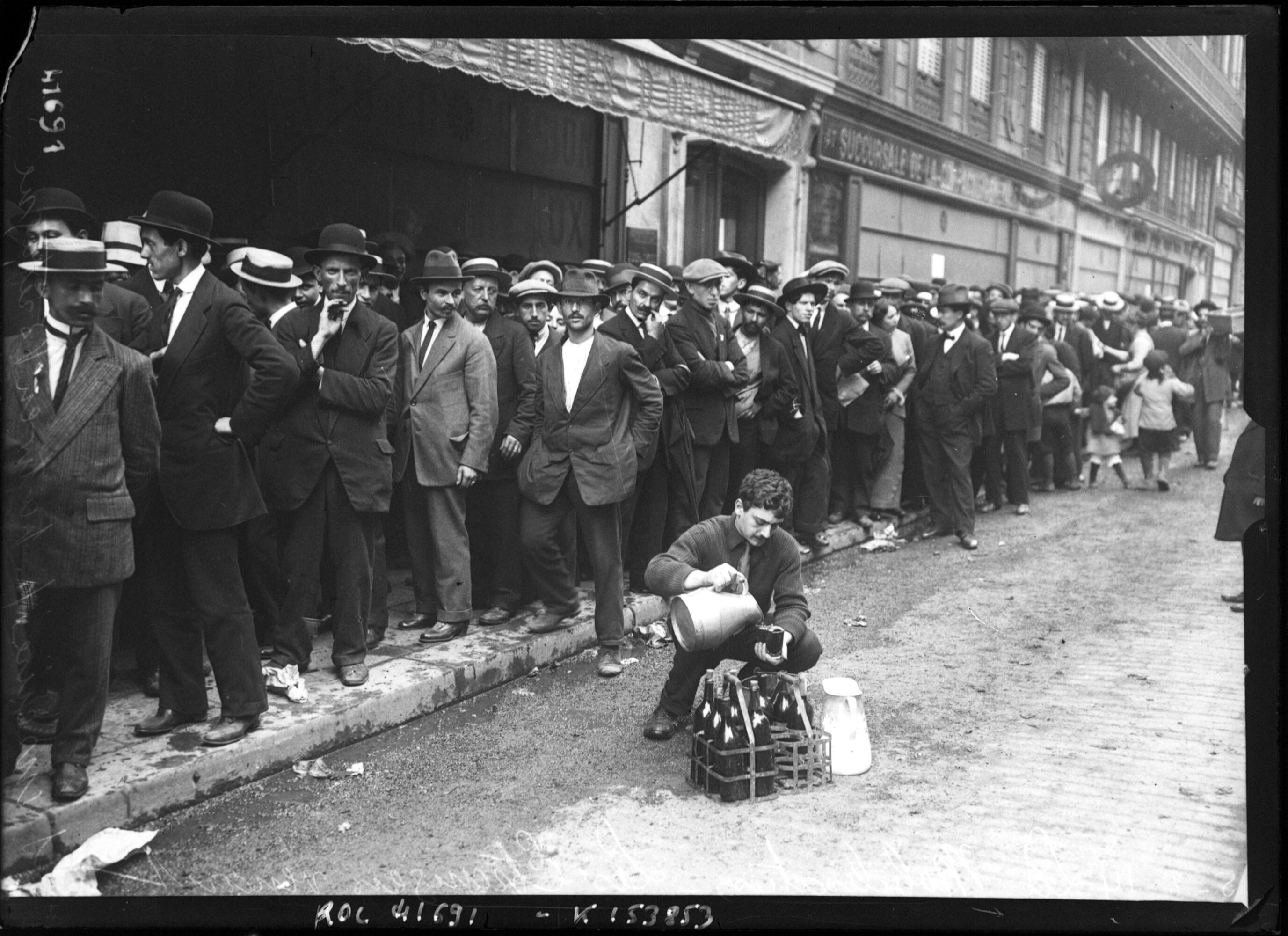
Registration of foreign residents prior to their forced evacuation to Brittany, Paris, August 5.

The freedom and secrecy of correspondence no longer existed: military mail, which was systematically late (making any indiscretions unusable), was checked before dispatch, and letters that were pessimistic, defeatist or giving precise information were seized or redacted (lines crossed out) by the postal censorship services. Freedom of the press was affected by censorship: initially, "information other than that communicated by the government or the command on operations, the order of battle, the number of troops (including wounded, killed or prisoners), defense work", etc., were forbidden, as well as "any information or article concerning military or diplomatic operations likely to favor the enemy and exert an unfortunate influence on the spirit of the army and the population", and "substantive articles violently attacking the government or army leaders" and those "tending to the cessation or suppression of hostilities." The press was checked before printing, and articles deemed unpatriotic were banned from publication, sometimes leaving the space for white rectangles.

=== Economic difficulties ===
From July 31, the French government took a series of economic decisions to accompany its entry into the war. The export of products that could be used for military purposes was prohibited: arms, munitions and explosives, of course, but also livestock, horses, canned goods, meat, flour, hides, fodder, hay, straw, aeroplanes, aerostats, cars, tires, camping gear, lead, etc. The budget allocated to the Ministry of War was increased by a credit of 208 million francs, covering new expenditure on barracks, remounting, clothing, bedding, furnishings, camping, health equipment, armaments and fortifications. To ensure the administration's workload, some civil servants were left on call, and those mobilized were gradually replaced by retired volunteers (later by women and the disabled). Pigeons were kept under surveillance (civilians were forbidden to move or import pigeons).

Army requisitioning of means of transport

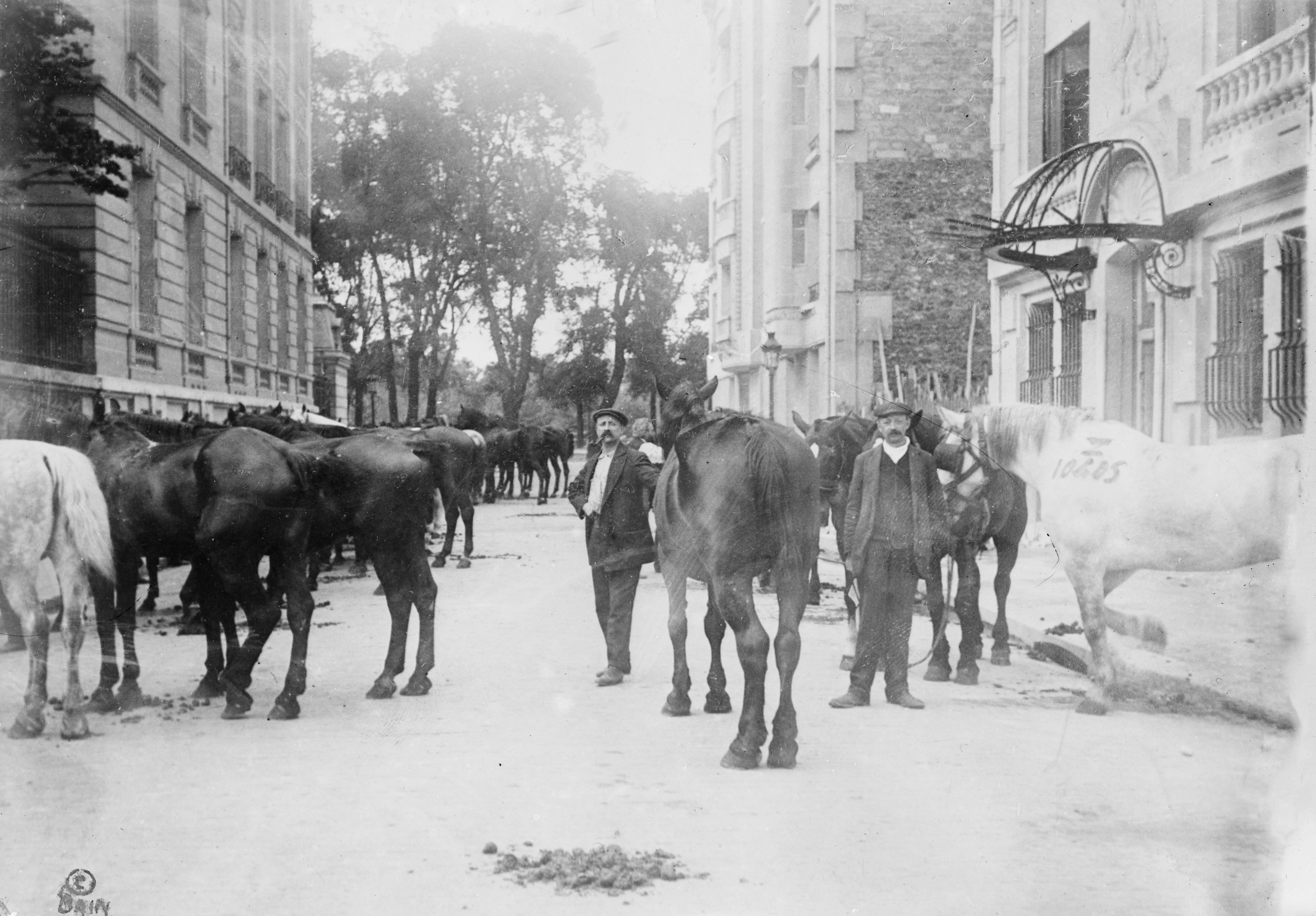
Requisition of horses in Paris.

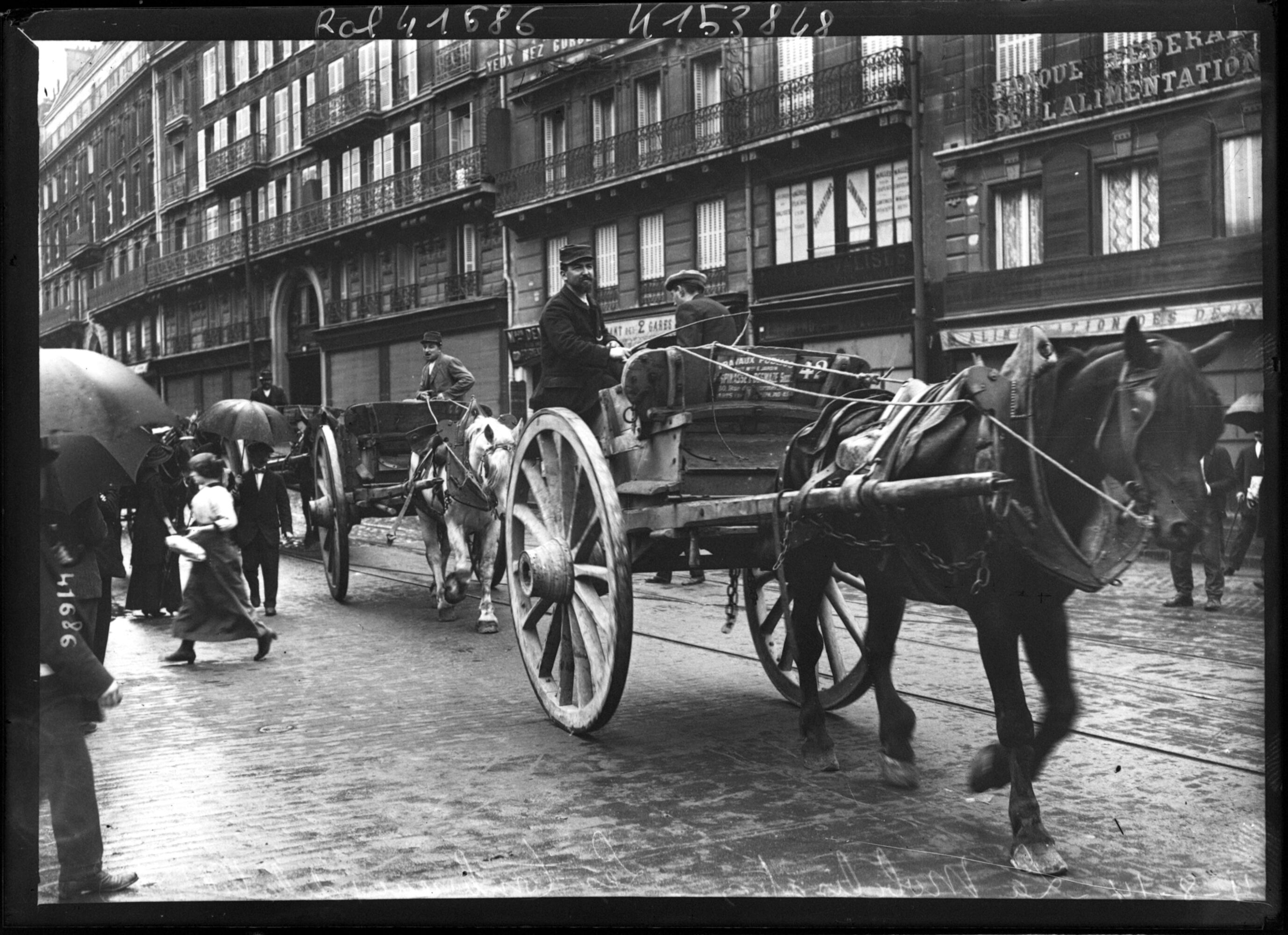
Departure for the army of carts of the city of Paris.

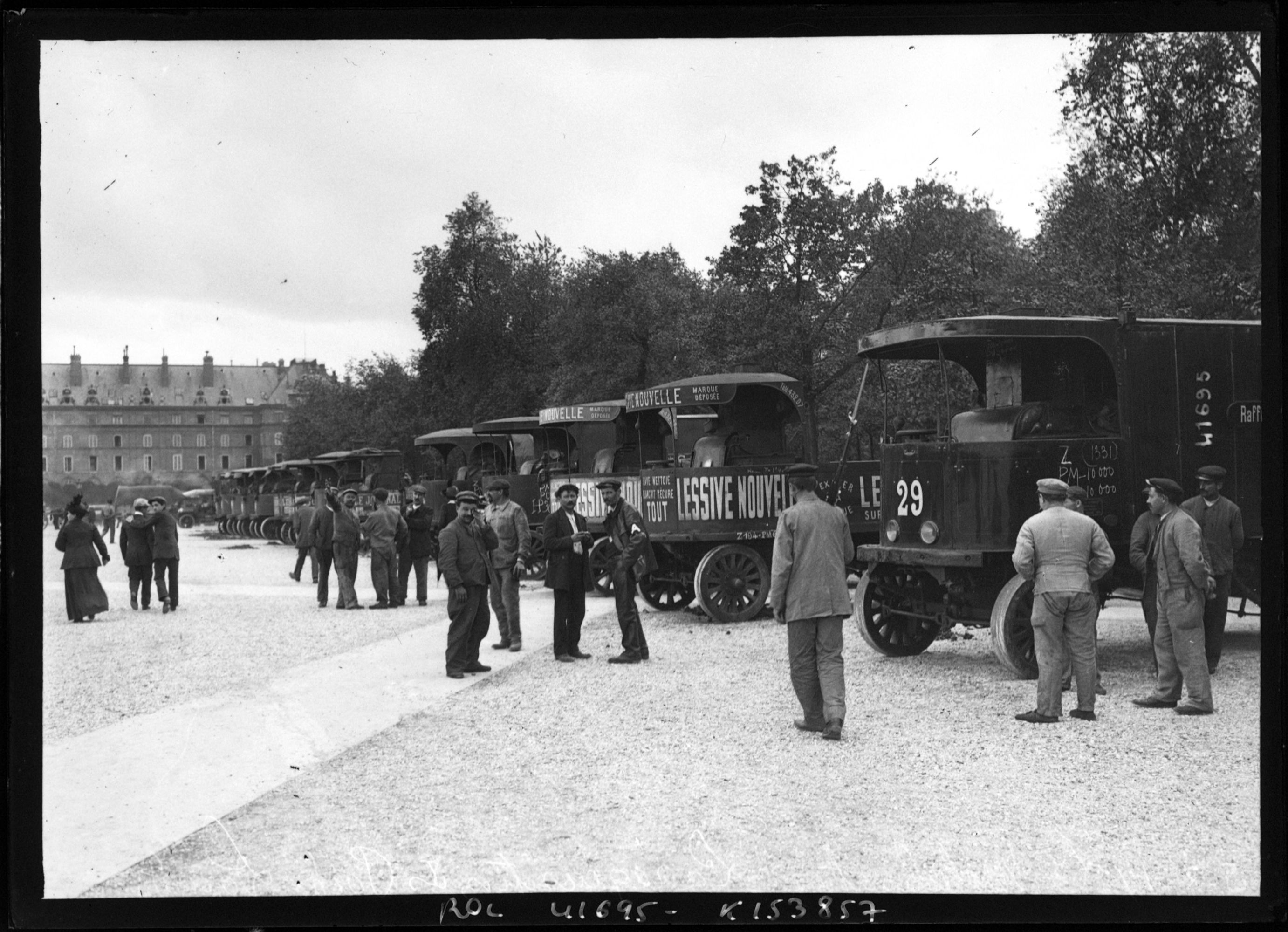
Regroupement of heavy goods vehicles in Paris.

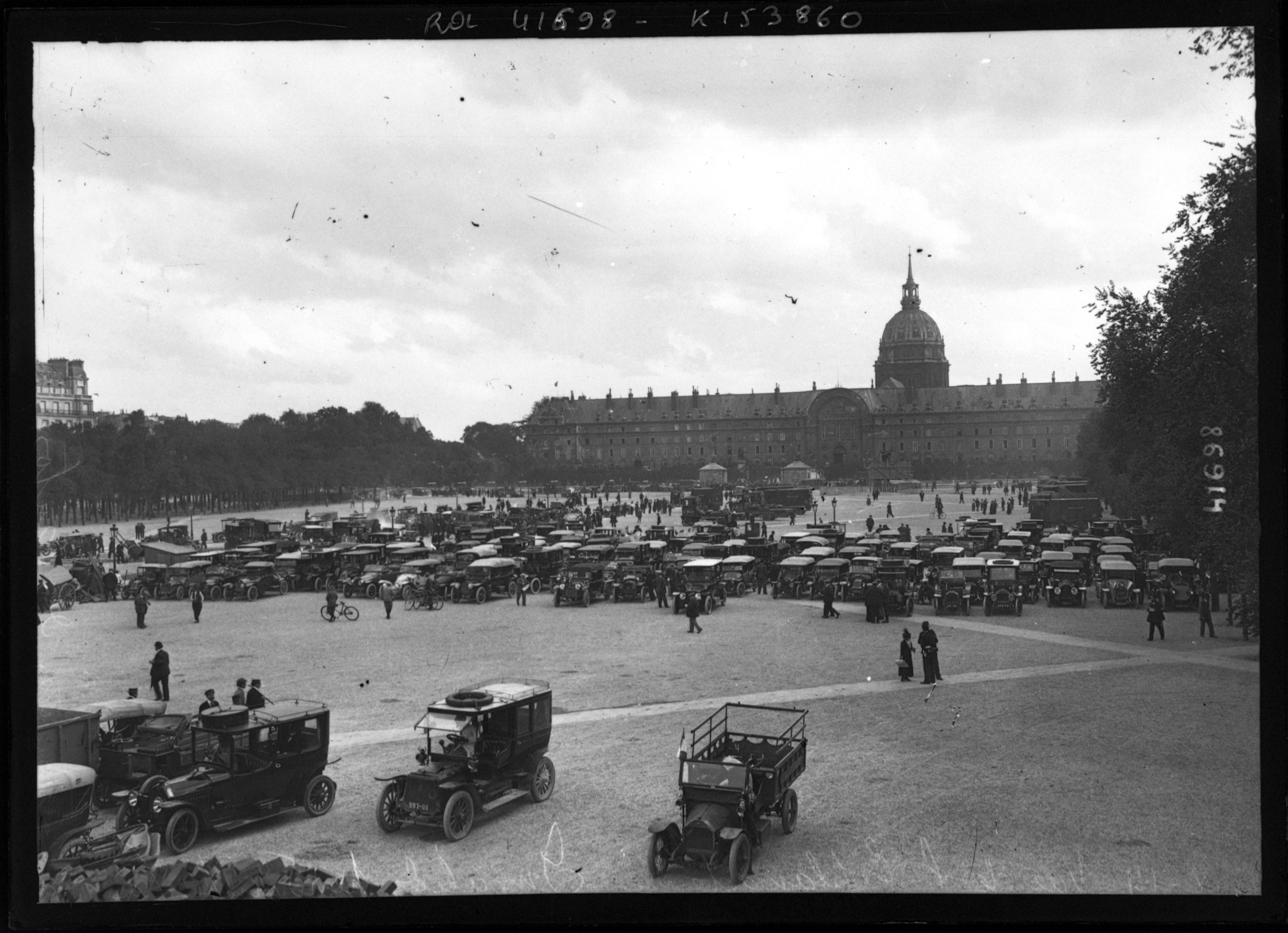
Automobile rally on the esplanade des Invalides, Paris, August 5, 1914.

Mass mobilization had immediate economic and social consequences: young adult men and horses (around 135,000 horses in August, 600,000 throughout the war, aged between five and fifteen, as well as mules and donkeys) left for the frontiers, completely disrupting the economy and society. Businesses slowed down or closed temporarily. The press greatly reduced its circulation, (Note: For example, the daily Le Temps is now printed on only four pages: see the August 3, 1914 edition. available at Gallica) as mobilization deprived it of some of its staff; mail stopped arriving during the mobilization period; civilian telephone service was suspended; every day, an official dispatch arrived in prefectures and sub-prefectures by telegraph from the Ministry of the Interior, before being posted. Passenger rail traffic was almost totally interrupted during the period of concentration, limited to lines not used by the army. In Montbéliard on August 5, all non-mobilized workers aged 16 to 60 were called by the municipality to work on fortifications at Fort Lachaux. Households stocked up on provisions as early as July 1914, fearing supply difficulties, queues formed in front of banks to withdraw savings and exchange them for gold, so much in fact that on the 30th the Banque de France suspended convertibility, while some inhabitants evacuated Paris to the south as soon as mobilization was announced. Under the law of August 5, 1914, a daily allowance of one franc and 25 centimes per day was paid to poor families whose "provider" was mobilized. Fearing a shortage of bread, reserve bakers were granted a 45-day deferment of call-up at the request of mayors, and on August 8 bakery production was limited to a four-pound loaf, while brioches, croissants and pastries were banned. On August 13, the government ordered the deferment of rents for the duration of the war.

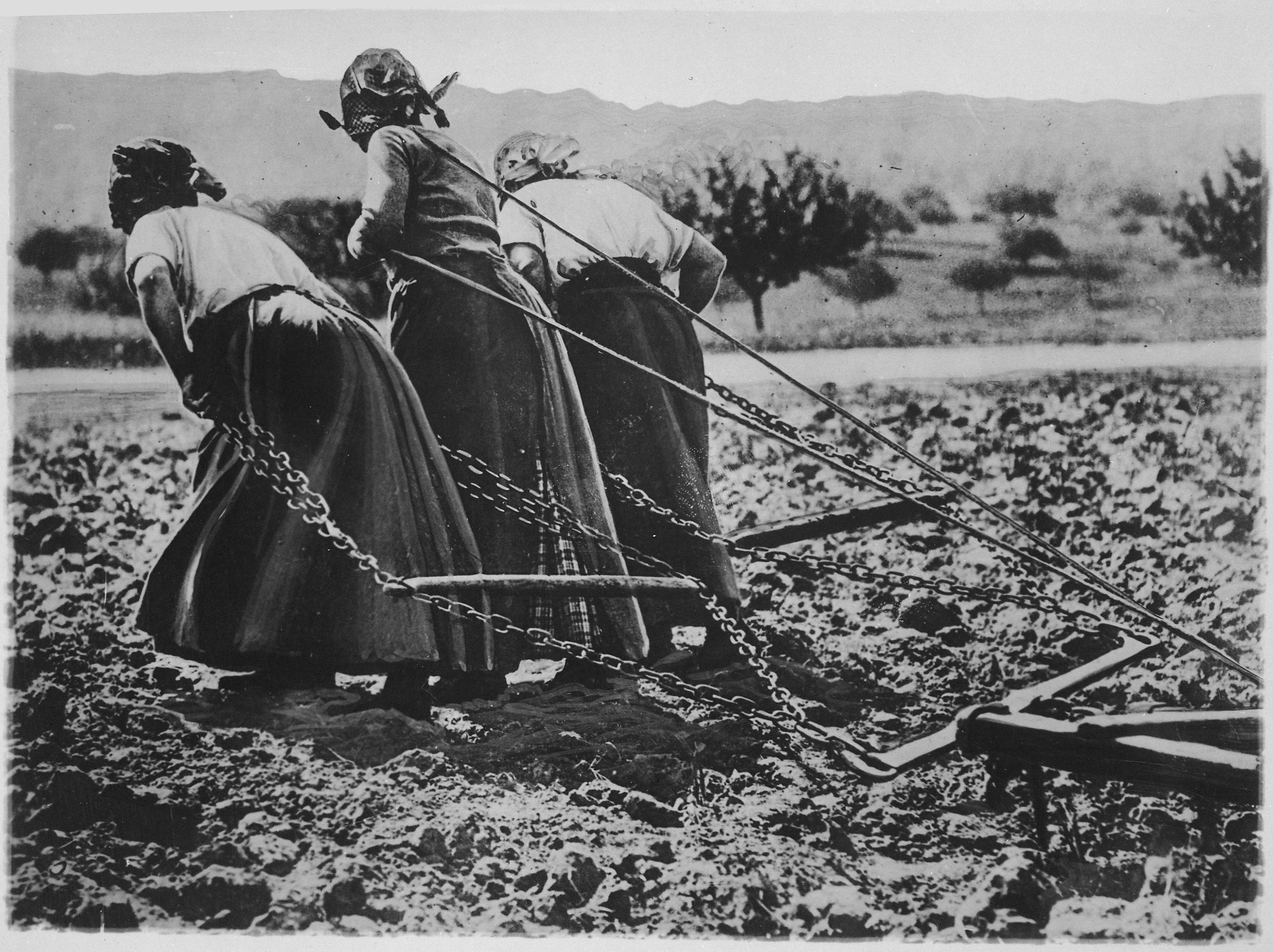
American propaganda image circa 1917: French women working the land.

French: « AUX FEMMES FRANÇAISES […] Le départ pour l'armée de tous ceux qui peuvent porter les armes laisse les travaux des champs interrompus; la moisson est inachevée, le temps des vendanges est proche. Au nom du Gouvernement de la République, au nom de la Nation, tout entière groupée derrière lui, je fais appel à votre vaillance, à celle des enfants que leur âge seul, et non le courage, dérobe au combat. Je vous demande de maintenir l'activité des campagnes, de terminer les récoltes de l'année, de préparer celles de l'année prochaine; vous ne pouvez pas rendre à la Patrie un plus grand service. […] Debout donc femmes françaises, jeunes enfants, filles et fils de la Patrie ! Remplacez sur le champ du travail ceux qui sont sur les champs de bataille. […] Debout, à l'action ! Il y aura demain de la gloire pour tout le monde. VIVE LA RÉPUBLIQUE ! VIVE LA FRANCE ! »

["TO THE FRENCH WOMEN [...] The departure for the army of all those who can bear arms leaves the work in the fields interrupted; the harvest is unfinished, the time of the grape harvest is near. In the name of the Government of the Republic, in the name of the Nation as a whole, united behind it, I appeal to your valour, to that of the children whose age alone, but not their courage, prevents them from fighting. I ask you to keep up the activity in the countryside, to finish this year's harvests, to prepare for next year's; you cannot do the Motherland a greater service. [...] Stand up, French women, young children, daughters and sons of the Motherland! Replace on the field of work those who are on the battlefields. [...] Get up and take action! Tomorrow there will be glory for everyone. LONG LIVE THE REPUBLIC! LONG LIVE FRANCE!"]

— René Viviani, ('Appel aux femmes françaises') Call to French women, poster, August 2, 1914.

Some harvesting and haymaking is still to be done (early August), while the grape harvest is still to come (September and October), and industry has to supply clothing, equipment, weapons and ammunition to the army. The mobilization plan left only 50,000 workers in armaments factories (powder works, artillery arsenals and thirty private suppliers), with rare call-up deferrals and partial replacement of mobilized workers by auxiliaries and non-mobilizables; other industrial sectors temporarily ceased operations. To feed the troops in the short term, the military authorities requisitioned flour, livestock and wine. From the end of 1914 onwards, solutions included recalling skilled workers to the rear ("affectés spéciaux", or special assigned), using female workers ("munitionnettes"), children, foreigners (notably Africans and Chinese), prisoners of war and the disabled.

=== Beginning of military operations ===
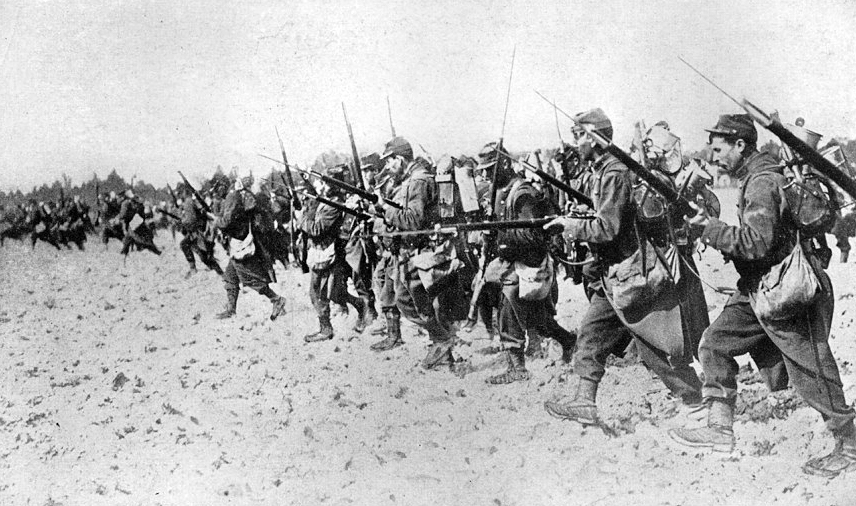
French infantry advancing in line, bayonets drawn, 1913.

The main consequences were military: general mobilization provided the French army with the manpower it needed to wage war against Germany and the other Central Powers. On August 4, covering troops seized the Vosges passes of La Schlucht (two hours after receiving notification of the declaration of war), Bussang and Oderen. On August 6, the cavalry corps entered Belgium via Bouillon, Bertrix and Paliseul. On August 7, the French 7th Corps crossed the border into Germany and began the conquest of Haute-Alsace. On August 14, all units of the 1st and 2nd Armies entered Moselle, while the 3rd, 4th and 5th Armies awaited the Germans along the Ardennes section of the Meuse.

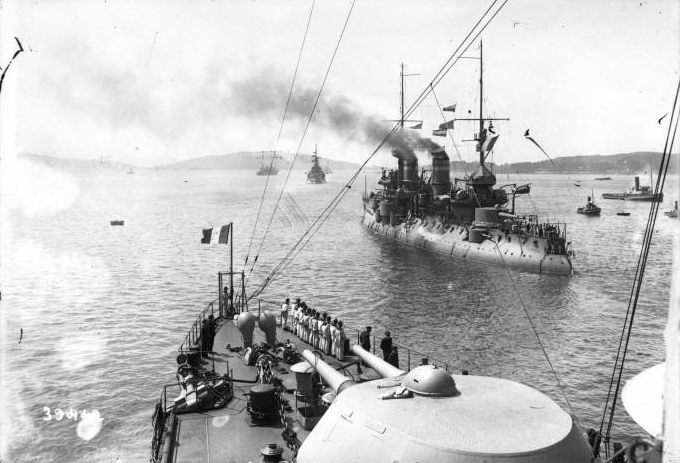
A French squadron in Toulon harbor: the Bouvet seen from another battleship.

For the French navy, the entry of the British into the war meant that it no longer had to fear the German navy. On August 3, 1914, the Franco-British convention of 1913 came into force, entrusting the North Sea, the Strait o Dover and the English Channel to the Royal Navy, while the French took charge of the Mediterranean, with the mission of hunting down enemy cruisers and establishing a naval blockade off Austrian ports. Consequently, only a light squadron of six cruisers was stationed at Cherbourg base (under the command of Rear Admiral Rouyer), supplemented by flotillas of torpedo boats and submarines at Dunkirk, Calais and Boulogne, while the "naval army" of 19 battleships was concentrated at Toulon (commanded by Admiral Boué de Lapeyrère), before moving to Valletta in September. As the Lorient fusiliers marins depot was full, and no landings were initially planned, on August 7 these troops, together with detachments from all the ports, formed two regiments grouped together in a fusiliers marins brigade (6,400 men, led by naval and marine officers). This brigade, commanded by Rear Admiral Ronarc'h, was sent to the stronghold of Paris from August 17, before being sent to the front on October 7.

== Later drafts ==
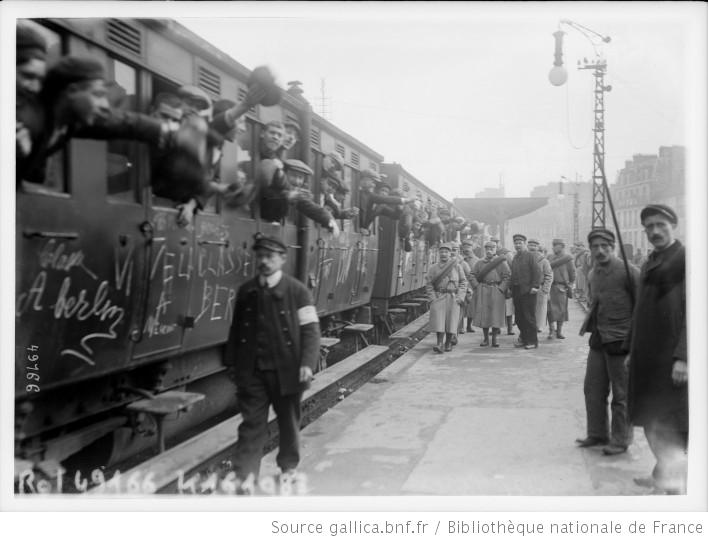
Departure of Class 18, 1917. On the wagons: "To Berlin".

French mobilization continued throughout the First World War, with the successive call-up of the Territorial Army Reserve (classes 1892 to 1888) from December 1914 to April 1915 and, above all, the advance of the classes 1914 (from September 1914, instead of October), 1915 (from December 1914), 1916 (in April 1915), 1917 (in January 1916), 1918 (in April 1917) and 1919 (in April 1918). These "rookies" first had to complete their training before going into battle; the class of 1919 was only at the front during the last weeks of the war (this was the case for the "last poilus" Fernand Goux and Pierre Picault). Even imprisoned criminals and ex-convicts were drafted into the Battalions of Light Infantry of Africa.

Conscription was gradually applied in the French colonies, but incorporation was uneven, varying according to status: pieds-noirs reservists were mobilized as early as August 1914, and assigned to zouave units; inhabitants of the "old colonies" (Saint Pierre and Miquelon, Guadeloupe, Martinique, French Guiana, the four communes of Senegal, Réunion, the Indies, New Caledonia and Polynesia) provided the manpower for colonial units (mainly colonial infantry regiments); natives (not considered as French citizens, but "subjects") of North Africa, West Africa, Equatorial Africa, Madagascar, the Somali coast, the Comoros and Indochina were more gradually forced into service, a first voluntary service (often encouraged or even forced by local chiefs), completed fairly limited call-ups, then by mass conscription from 1915 into units of Algerian, Senegalese, Moroccan, Tunisian, Malagasy, Tonkinese, Annamite and Somali tirailleurs. In total, all colonies combined, 583,450 men were gradually drafted, leading to several uprisings in the colonies.

The first estimate of the total number of men mobilized during the conflict was published in 1920 by MP Louis Marin (who, as budget recorder, needed to know how many families needed to be compensated), based on a report from the Army Staff. According to this document, which has since been widely reprinted, France mobilized a total of 8,410,000 men between August 2, 1914, and January 1, 1919, including 7,935,000 French and 475,000 colonials (176,000 Algerians, 136,000 Senegalese, 50,000 Tunisians, 42,500 Indochinese, 34,000 Moroccans, 34,000 Madagascans and 3,000 Somalis). Among these, 1,329,640 died as a result of the fighting, to which must be added around three million wounded (including 700,000 disabled).

== Historiography ==
Right from the start of the Great War, the main subject of historical research was not mobilization itself, but the causes and, above all, the people responsible for the conflict. The first historian to really look into the subject of mobilization was Charles Petit-Dutaillis, medievalist and rector of the Grenoble academy in 1914, who ordered all teachers in the Isère, Drôme and Hautes-Alpes regions to report on the attitude of the local population in the early days. This rector's initiative was passed on to the Minister of Public Instruction, Albert Sarraut, who decided to send out a circular dated September 18, 1914, instructing all non-mobilized teachers to keep notes on war-related events, starting with mobilization. During and after the conflict, it was the diplomatic aspects (always linked to the question of responsibilities) and military aspects (essentially operations) that dominated historical production, with the work of Pierre Renouvin in particular.

The gradual publication of soldiers' testimonies did nothing to change this: for most of the twentieth century, the almost exclusive vision of this entry into the war, printed and taught, was that of general acceptance of the conflict by the population and the departure of the soldiers "avec la fleur au fusil", or "[with] the flower on the rifle" (expression used as the title of Jean Galtier-Boissière's testimonial, published in 1928), interpreted as an enthusiastic surge reflecting the spirit of revenge on Germany. The success of this mythical vision of the French entry into the war can be explained by three factors. The first was the immediate usefulness of a mobilization that was presented as enthusiastic, and which was the popular equivalent of the Sacred Union, both of which seemed to emanate from the people as a whole, whereas they were merely the fruit of circumstance. Secondly, the images conveyed by the press and the writings of intellectuals exalting the war contributed powerfully to forging this myth of the flower in the gun. Finally, this representation makes it possible to transfer responsibility for the conflict onto the political leaders, with the crowds letting themselves be carried away by their naivety, without there being any question of their consenting to the war. This consensus was suited to an interwar French population that was both patriotic and pacifist, since it was as compatible with a right-wing opinion (the war was triggered by patriotism and the Germans) as it was with a left-wing opinion (the real perpetrators of the carnage were the politicians and, more generally, the elites).

In the early 1960s, Jean-Jacques Becker made the study of public opinion at the time of the French entry into the war the subject of his thesis, supervised by Renouvin. Since Becker doubted the consensus, he set out to find sources that would show the state of public opinion in 1914, and found Petit-Dutaillis's compilation in the library and archive center La contemporaine. Using schoolteachers' reports, cross-referenced with other sources (press, prefectoral records, etc.), he challenged the myth of "la fleur au fusil." He remained convinced, however, that the French massively embraced the war as a national cause. While Jean-Jacques Becker's thesis is undisputed for the start of the war, other historians such as Jules Maurin and Philippe Boulanger note that, after the first three months, voluntary enlistments abandoned their patriotic character in favor of a survival strategy. Indeed, being called up early enabled volunteers to choose their branch of assignment. Volunteers were more likely to choose the artillery or navy, reputed to be less deadly than the infantry. This observation therefore undermines the idea that the French always consented to war.

Historian Nicolas Mariot refutes the idea that the war was the "melting pot of a class union, social inequalities of French society in the 1900s persisted under the uniform" by studying the letters and diaries of intellectuals such as Apollinaire and the philosopher Alain, who were either ordinary soldiers or low-ranking soldiers at the front. These intellectuals regretted that their comrades-in-arms from the common people (peasants, craftsmen or workers) did not share their ideals, many of them patriotic. Feeling socially isolated despite an overcrowding that disturbed them, they had little patience for popular swearing or drinking parties. The common soldier looked on them with more suspicion than to the officer, who is often a man designated by rank.

== See also ==
- French Army order of battle (1914)
- Battle of Antivari
- French cavalry during World War I
