= Battle of Morhange =

1914 WWI battle in Lorraine

- Part of Battle of the Frontiers (First World War)
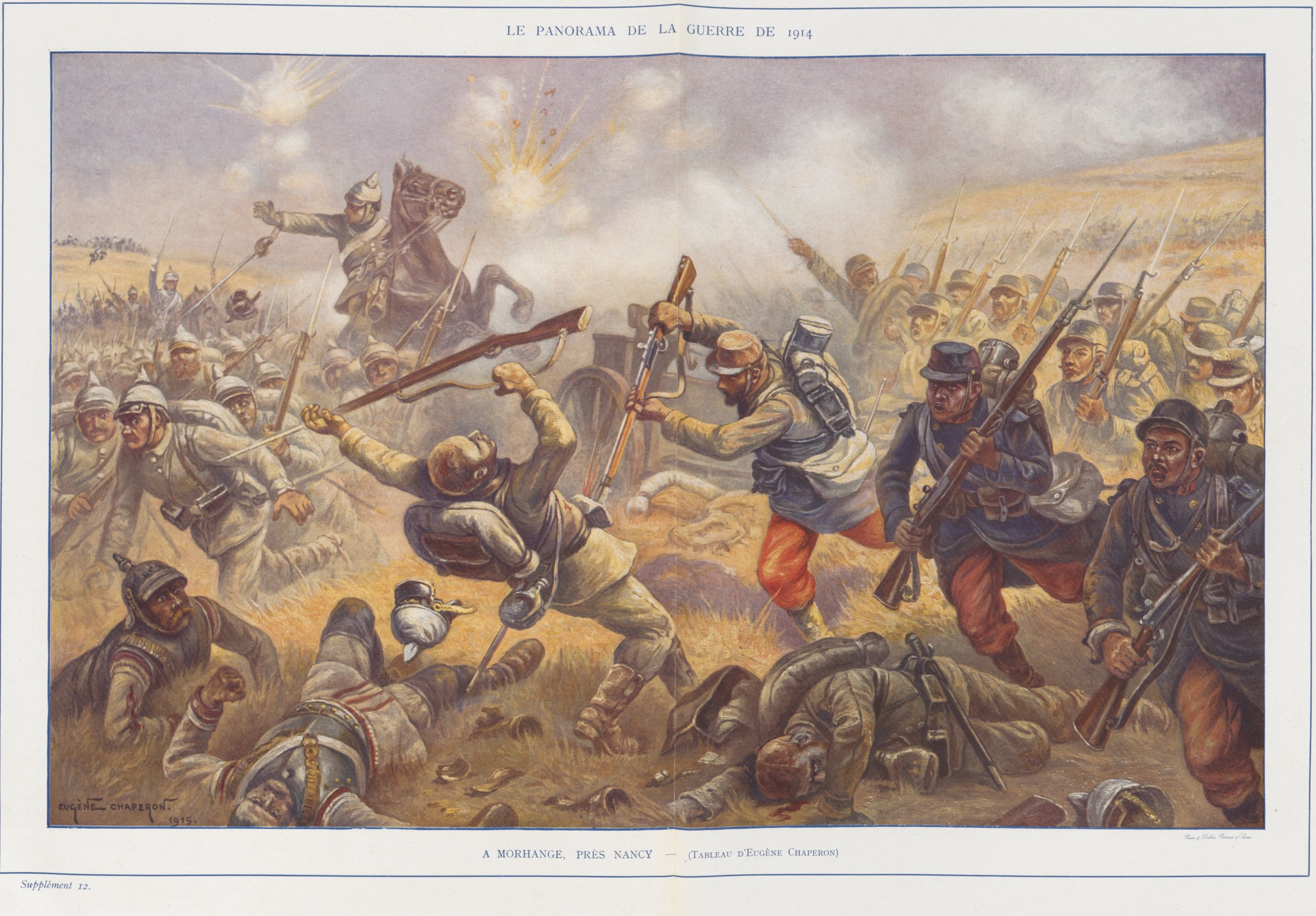
- French propaganda painting depicting the Battle of Morhange on 20 August 1914
Date	19 to 20 August 1914
Location	Morhange, Lorraine, German Empire 48.904707°N 6.634166°E
Result	German victory

Belligerents
France	German Empire

Commanders and leaders
Édouard de Castelnau	Rupprecht, Crown Prince of Bavaria

Units involved
2nd Army	6th Army

Casualties and losses
5,000 killed, 15,000 wounded	2,000 killed, unknown wounded
- circa 7000 killed in total, many more thousands injured.

The Battle of Morhange (French: bataille de Morhange; German: Schlacht bei Mörchingen) was one of the first major battles of the First World War during its initial phase (the Battle of the Frontiers). It took place between 19 and 20 August 1914 on a front stretching for nearly 30 kilometers involving the villages of Morhange and Dieuze in the present-day Moselle department, then German territory.

The battle pitted the French 2nd Army, commanded by General Édouard de Castelnau, against the German 6th Army, commanded by Rupprecht, Crown Prince of Bavaria. The French 2nd Army comprised three main units: the 20th Army Corps commanded by General Ferdinand Foch, the 15th Army Corps and the 16th Army Corps. After a difficult week of advancing through German Lorraine, resulting in considerable losses among the French ranks, the exhausted soldiers approached the Battle of Morhange. On 19 August, Castelnau gave the order to attack the German army the following day therefore he and his men were forced to retreat to Nancy.

On 20 August, conflicting instructions disrupted the initial plan: while Foch was supposed to remain in place to guard the flank of the rest of the army, he too attacked Morhange. The French offensive, deceived by the enemy who initially feigned a retreat, was ultimately halted by a well-organized German rear defensive line, and the battle was extremely bloody.

Meanwhile, in the southeast of what is now the Moselle department, the Battle of Sarrebourg pitted the French 1st Army under General Augustin Dubail against the German 7th Army. Both battles ended in French defeats against the troops of Rupprecht of Bavaria, now nicknamed the "Victor of Metz".

Following the Battle of Morhange, controversies arose in France regarding General Foch's conduct and the precise role he played. The shortcomings of the high command were then blamed on the "soldiers from the south", particularly those of the 15th Corps.

== Background ==
=== The Nied-Saar trap ===
Although mobilization measures had been undertaken, France entered the war without a true operational plan. Plan XVII was in reality only a plan for the mobilization and concentration of the French Armed Forces prepared in 1913. It owes its name to the fact that it was the 17th such plan since the end of the Franco-Prussian War of 1870. The French commander-in-chief, General Joseph Joffre, simply indicated in the secret directive he signed on 7 February 1914, that he intended to launch two offensives in eastern France at the outset of hostilities, aimed at reconquering all or part of the lost provinces of Alsace-Lorraine. However, such a manoeuvre was not without any risk. The German Empire had established the formidable fortresses of Strasbourg, and the Moselstellung between Thionville and Metz. Together with the Northern Vosges mountain range, the fortifications formed a kind of trap, creating what was known as the "Delme Corridor," into which it was extremely perilous to venture. This danger had been clearly outlined by various French strategists, notably Lieutenant-Colonel Grouard, but the General Staff believed that, with adequate resources, these offensives were possible. Consequently, Plan XVII envisioned massing two large armies in the region, supported by reserve units, totaling twenty-four divisions, representing one-third of the French Army.

German strategists had long anticipated that, in the event of war, the French would attempt, regardless of the circumstances, to recapture their lost provinces of Lorraine and Alsace. They therefore undertook significant fortification works and trained their troops in anticipation of French offensives in this region. They believed that such operations would be doomed to failure and would offer them the opportunity for a counter-attack that could turn into a decisive battle in their favor. Combined with their planned encirclement through Belgium, as outlined in the Schlieffen Plan, this counter-attack would allow them to achieve the swifter and more complete annihilation of the French armies. In 1912, the German General Helmuth von Moltke devised a plan to lure the French into the Land of Ponds between Morhange and Fénétrange, exposing them to flank attacks launched from the Forts of Metz on the left and from the Vosges Mountains on the right: this would become the "Nied- Saar trap", named after the two rivers forming the bottom of this geographical snare. The combination of this plan, along with a series of risky decisions made by the French high command in the days leading up to the Battle of Morhange, offered the Germans an opportunity for victory that exceeded all their expectations.

=== The beginnings of the French offensive in the East ===
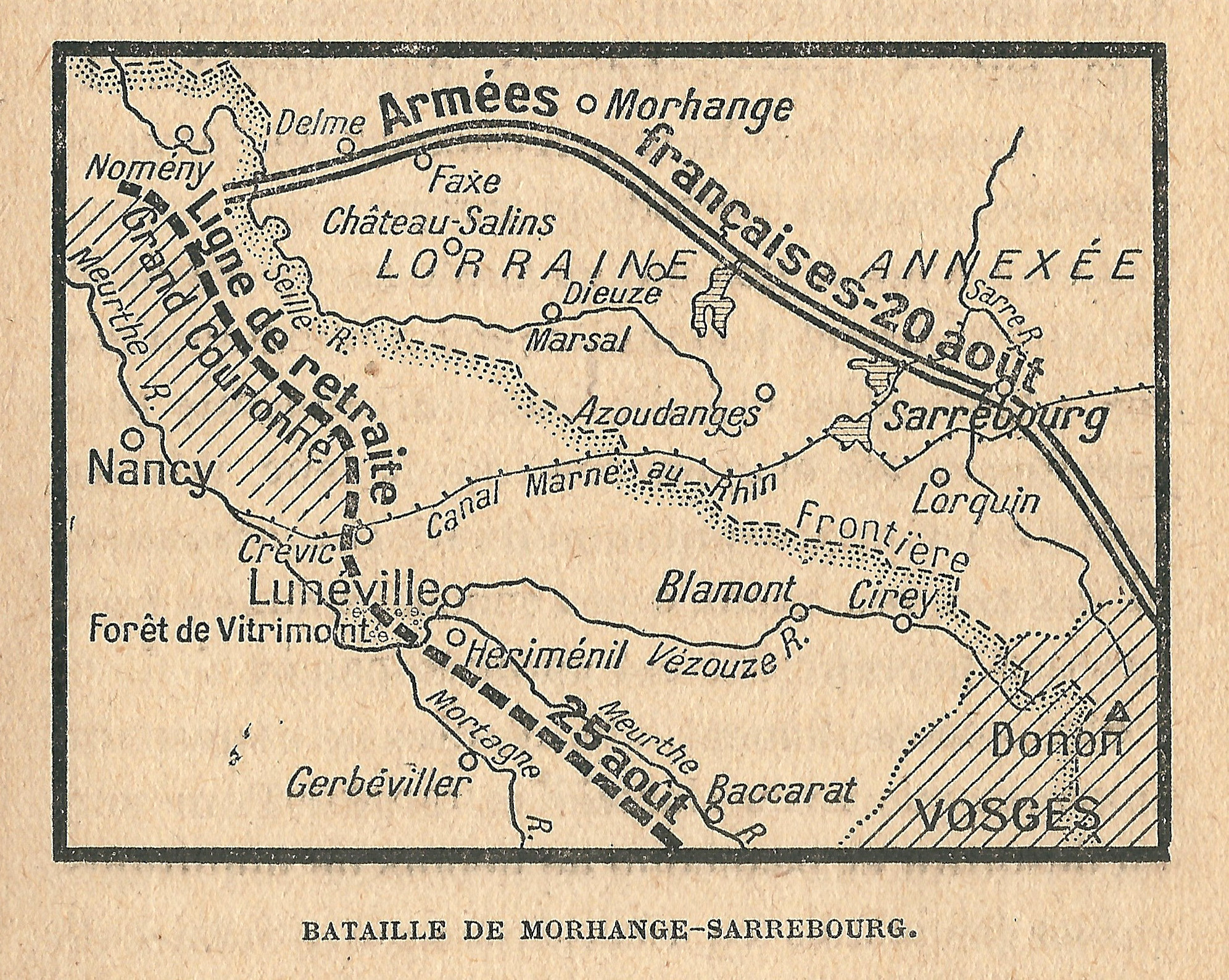
French advance in front of Morhange then their retreat.

Even before the Battle of Morhange began, the French suffered an initial setback that should have made them more wary. From the early days of WW1 on 3 August, Joffre ordered a first operation aimed at breaking through the Belfort Gap and the Oderen Pass, entering German territory, and conquering Alsace towards Colmar. This action was entrusted to the 7th Army Corps, which, as a covering corps, was at full strength from 3 August. The first phase of this operation was encouraging for the French as by 7 August they had already taken Thann, Masevaux and Altkirch. On the afternoon of 8 August, the 14th Infantry Division entered Mulhouse without a fight. The next day the German response was extremely brutal with a double counter-attack led by three divisions; one on Cernay and the others on Illzach and Riedisheim The German 7th Army forced the two French divisions to withdraw on 10 August under the protection of the fortified region of Belfort.

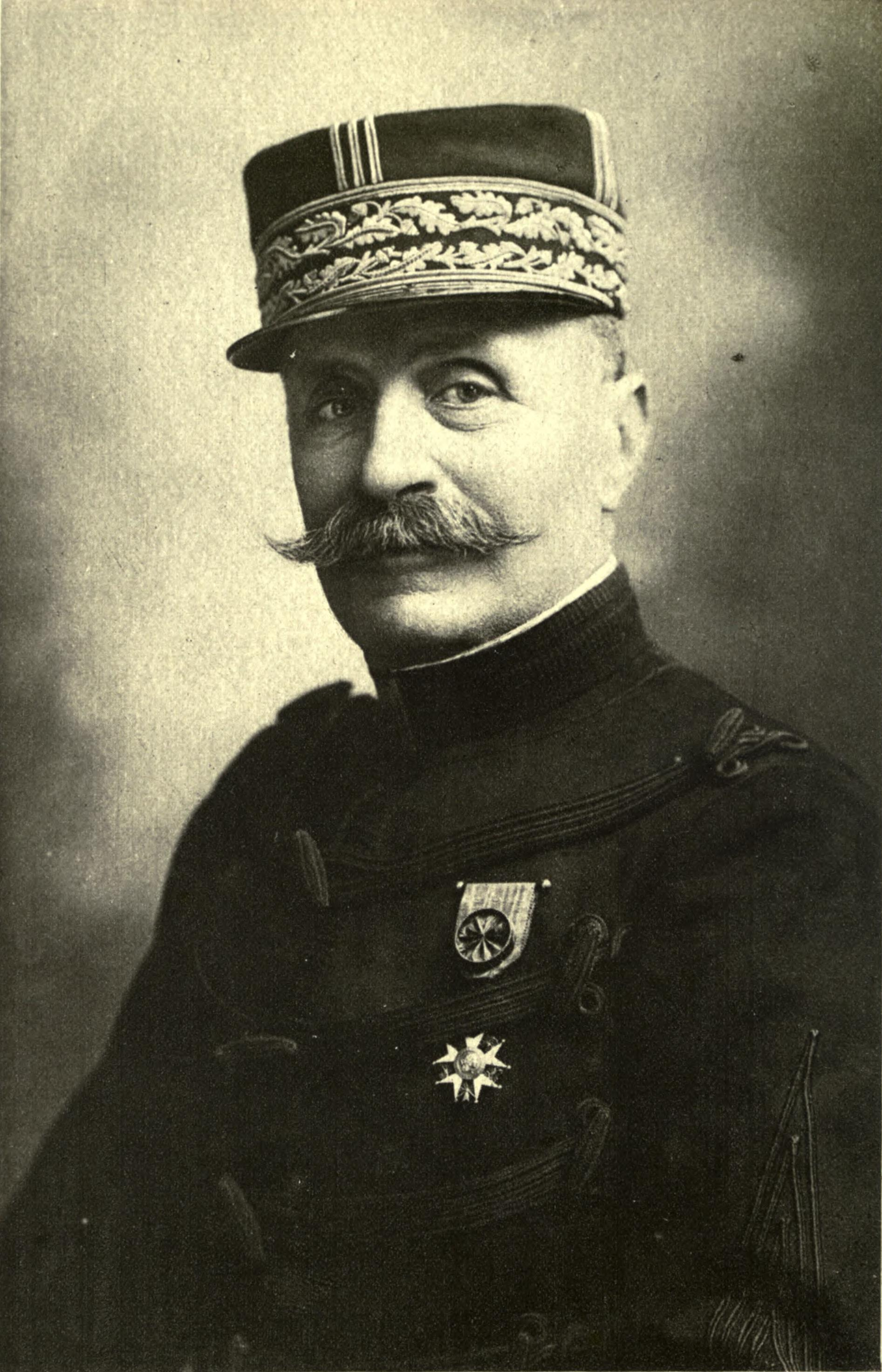
Ferdinand Foch in 1915

However, this initial setback did not deter General Joffre from moving on to the main phase of his plan. This obstinacy astonished the Germans. As the head of operations for the Bavarian 6th Army, General Hermann Mertz von Quirnheim, noted: “I cannot imagine that the French will repeat on a larger scale in Lorraine the folly they have just committed in Upper Alsace… but if they do indeed march east of Metz in great numbers, it would not take much skill on our part to bring about their downfall”. On 14 August 1914, General Augustin Dubail's 1st Army marched towards Sarrebourg and the Donon mountain, while General de Castelnau's 2nd Army began its advance towards Morhange. The army he commanded comprised three main units: the 20th Army Corps, commanded by General Ferdinand Foch; the 15th Army Corps, commanded by General Espinasse; and the 16th Army Corps, commanded by General Louis-Émile Taverna. He also had at his disposal the 2nd group of Reserve Divisions, commanded by General Léon Durand, whose mission was to hold the Grand-Couronné massif, protecting the city of Nancy. Initially, due to the risks involved in such an offensive, the 2nd Army was planned to have a total of five army corps. However, from 9 August, concerned about German movements in Belgium, the Commander-in-Chief General Joffre decided to withdraw the 18th and 9th Army Corps and move them north to theSomme, which had initially been assigned to General de Castelnau, who in a note to General Headquarters, protested against this measure, which, according to him, distorted the Lorraine operation he was to lead. In his private correspondence, he was even more severe: “My army has been deprived of two fine and valuable units that constituted one of the most precious elements of my confidence,” he wrote to his son. “[…] I am therefore outraged to see such fantasies arising in such serious matters under the influence of purely imaginary deductions. I know what kind of fevered mind this sudden change comes from. I have always warned those in authority against these daydreams. I deeply and painfully regret not having been heeded. It is an affront to common sense. It will cost us dearly". It was therefore with significantly diminished forces and artillery that the French crossed the Seille on 14 August, which marks the border between France and Germany, as established by the Treaty of Frankfurt in 1871.

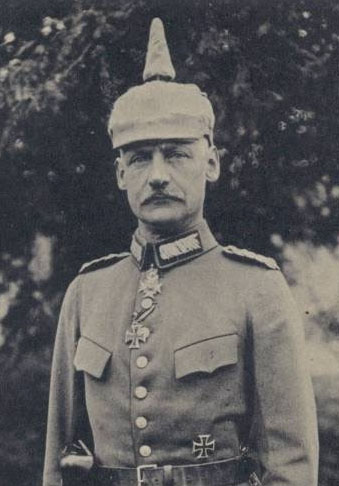
Crown Prince Rupprecht of Bavaria in 1915

The French were unaware that they were being met by a large German force under the command of Crown Prince Rupprecht, the heir to the Bavarian throne. He had two powerful armies at his disposal: the Bavarian 6th Army, which he commanded himself, and the German 7th Army under General Josias von Heeringen. Together, they comprised eight army corps reinforced by five divisions from the Metz General Reserve. This battle force, totaling 25 divisions, was supported by 1,800 guns, a large proportion of which were heavy artillery. The Crown Prince had been instructed to allow the French to advance as far as possible into the Nied-Saar trap before counter-attacking and destroying them. But, fortunately for the French, Rupprecht of Bavaria would not have the patience to let them penetrate as far as the German Generalissimo von Moltke had hoped. He was eager for victory, as evidenced by the proclamation he sent to his troops: “Soldiers of the Sixth Army! Higher considerations have compelled me to restrain your warlike zeal. The time for waiting and retreat is over. We must advance now; our hour has come. We must conquer, and we will conquer!” In reality, by counter-attacking the French before.

== The Battle of Morhange ==
=== Prelude to the battles ===
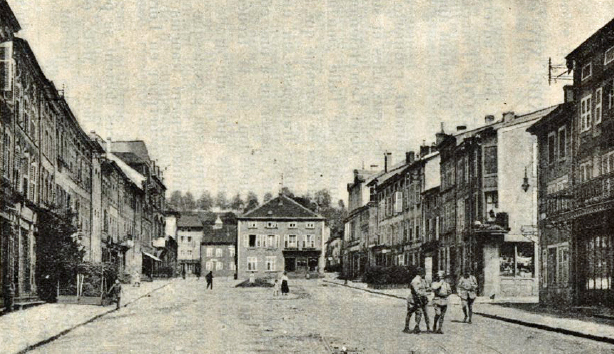
The town square of Morhange in 1910

For a week, between 14 and 20 August 1914, the French 2nd Army under Castlenau easily advanced into the Lorraine region, then-German territory since 1870. Forming the 2nd army's left flank, General Foch's 20th Corps moved forward without difficulty across a landscape of hills and meadows.Such facilitated the march of its regiments. In contrast, the 15th and 16th Corps, who were poorly trained in large-scale maneuvers, struggled to organize coordinated movements and appropriate combat formations in terrain unpleasantly dominated by ponds and marshland. This resulted in "indescribable disorder", as 2nd Army General de Castelnau said to his Corps commander General Taverna. From the outset, the French encountered numerous pockets of resistance from small German units which proved remarkably effective in this marshy environment. The crossing of the village of Moncourt turned into a bloodbath to the point that brigade commander General Gasquy was forced to request to retreat. The 2nd Army headquarters then relieved him as commander of his brigade. He had ordered it to charge with bayonets fixed against German machine guns entrenched in fortified shelters. General de Castelnau deplored the soldiers' lack of training and the fact that his officers had no understanding of modern warfare. He issued numerous warnings, demanding that enemy positions no longer be attacked head-on, but rather outflanked after a massive artillery barrage. While his instructions were well followed by the 20th Foch's Corps, a unit long prepared for modern warfare, as demonstrated by the capture of the village of Donnelay-Juvelize, the 15th and 16th Corps, on the other hand, suffered heavy losses.

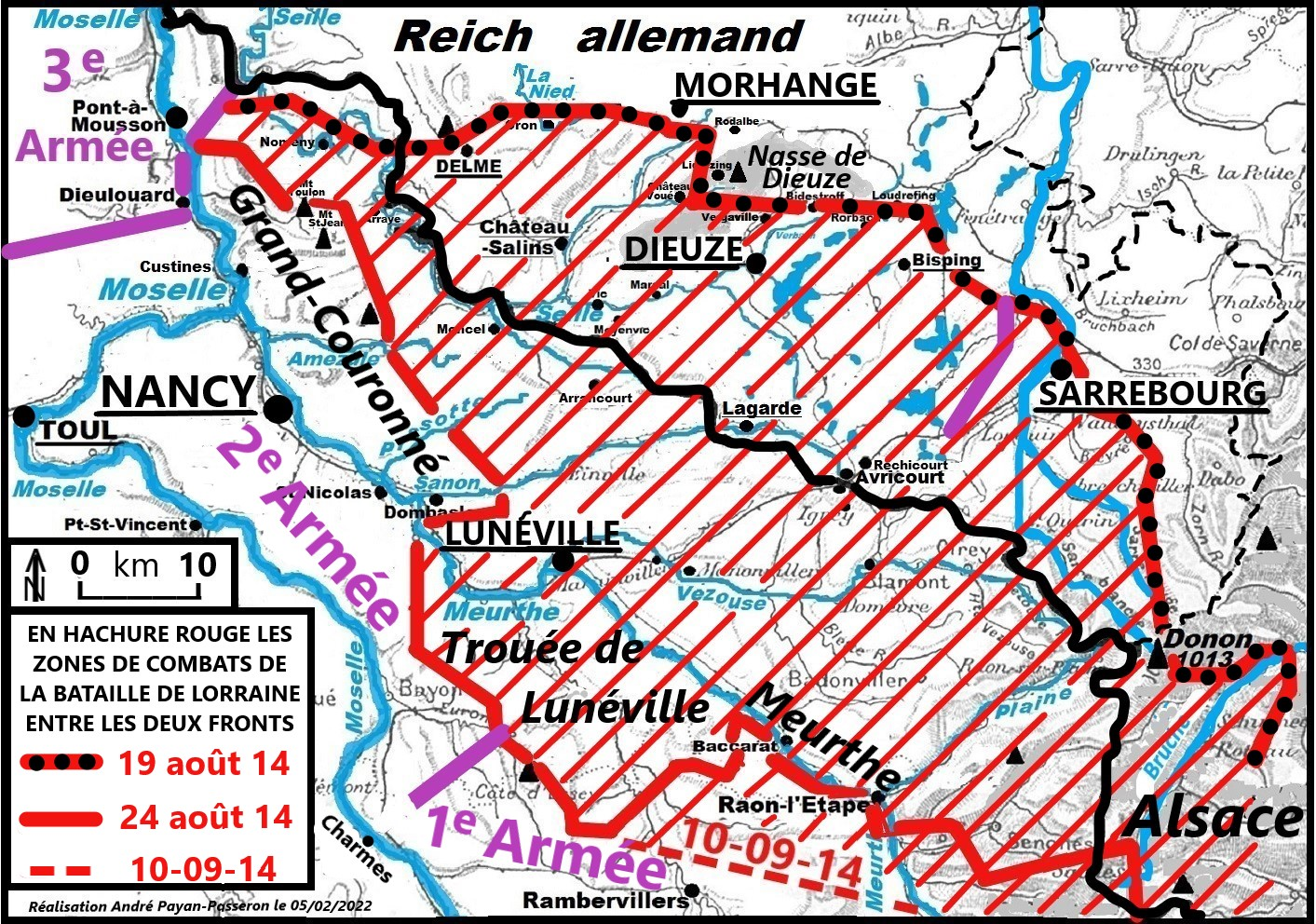
The areas of combat in Lorraine from 5 August to 15 September 1914 are shown in red hatching.

After this week of extremely difficult progress, the soldiers would approach the Battle of Morhange exhausted and traumatized by the losses that had already severely decimated their ranks. On 19 August, the nature of the fighting changed abruptly. The Germans were no longer content with harassing operations, then withdrawing. They now aggressiely confronted the French and utilized powerful heavy artillery. Only an army-wide battle could allow the French advance to continue. Castelnau anticipated this for the following day and had prepared for it with his staff. In the impending battle, the Germans had the advantage of terrain as they were positioned along a ridge stretching from Morhange to Fénétrange in positions prepared in advance. They had notably marked the firing paths for their machine guns and artillery. Moreover, they were concealed from view by the French, who were unable to spot them with their aircraft due to the poor weather conditions that made any overflight impossible.

Added to these advantages was a powerful element of surprise. The French General Headquarters (GQG) made a serious error in its assessment of the forces involved. Generally speaking, it underestimated the number of major German units in the Western theatre of operations. Indeed, it estimated that it had between thirteen and fifteen army corps to fight, whereas in reality there were nearly twice that number. It located no more than six in the East. In fact, there were eight, not counting several Ersatz divisions. Yet, Commander Cartier, head of ciphers at the Ministry of War, had tried to warn the General Headquarters of a worrying enemy concentration near Castelnau. According to his intelligence, no fewer than four army corps were massed between Metz and the Vosges Mountains. But the General Headquarters disregarded this information. He maintained this offensive, even though the situation had changed considerably in recent days. The German entry into Belgium radically altered the strategic parameters of this operation. The objective was no longer to defeat the Germans in Lorraine to reoccupy part of this lost province, but simply to tie down the German troops massed in the Metz fortress to prevent them from reinforcing the other German armies engaged in Belgium. Consequently, this offensive was not only dangerous but had become pointless. The same result could have been achieved by advancing only a few kilometers beyond the border, as far a Château-Salins, while being prepared to retreat in case of too strong an encounter.

=== Procedure ===
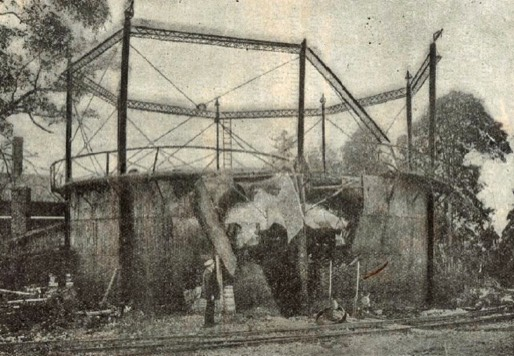
French soldiers wounded in the courtyard of the Morhange barracks the day after the fighting of 20 August

Unaware of the danger that threatened him, the evening of 19 August, Castelnau dictated his instructions for the following day. This Army Order No.27 specified the role he intended for the three remaining active army corps. The 15th and 16th Corps would lead the offensive, while Foch's corps (the 20th) would remain static, protecting them from attacks. The start of operations was scheduled for dawn. The next day, 20 August at 4:15 a.m., Castelnau hesitated, wanting to obtain the latest intelligence from the air force which had been grounded by fog. At 5:30 a.m., finally, he was able to launch his troops. At the same moment, after several hours of inexplicable delay he received a copy of the orders that Foch had given to the 20th Army Corps for that day. They were contradiction with these instructions as Foch was attacking Morhange, when he was told to be stationary, ready to flank the rest of the army. At the headquarters of the 2nd Army, General François Anthoine reacted immediately by ordering him to stop this attack.

Foch believed it was too late to restrain his troops, who were already on the offensive. Moreover, this order was already obsolete, as considerable masses of Bavarian and German soldiers suddenly emerged from the heights of Morhange. They swept along the entire length of the front of the three French army corps, accompanied by a deluge of heavy artillery shells. The Nied-Sarre trap had just been deployed against the French soldiers.

At the 20th Corps, the situation was already critical. The French 39th Infantry Division was caught in its flank. Its six regiments, which had advanced towards the hills west of Morhange, first suffered a terrible artillery barrage organized by the Bavarian IIIe corps reinforced by heavy guns towed from the forts of Metz. Then, at 7:30 a.m., the Bavarians launched their own attack. They quickly overwhelmed the 39th Infantry Division, capturing many of its cannons. In the center of the French line, the French 15th Corps 15th Army Corps launched an attack across marshy terrain. Many soldiers drowned, while others fell victim to artillery fire from the ridges. The situation turned disastrous when the Bavarian II Corps poured into the gap opened on its left flank by Foch's offensive on Morhange, and at the same time, the Germans of the XXI Corps appeared on its right flank. General de Gasquy watched helplessly as the German onslaught unfolded. To those urging him to flee, he replied, "There's no point running! We'll probably all be killed here". The French 16th Army Corps was in no better position, under attack on both its flanks. He no longer has the protection of the 1st Army which, having been pushed back at Sarrebourg, is now in retreat. The entire French deployment in the East is about to be swept away.

=== French retreat ===
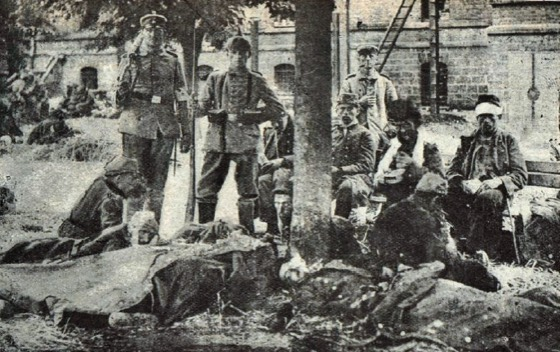
French soldiers wounded in the courtyard of the Morhange barracks the day after the fighting of 20 August

Barely informed of all these setbacks that arose so brutally and against the course of events, Castelnau decided to relaunch his air force. He sensed that he was the victim of a very large-scale, meticulously planned operation. And the situation was urgent. Less than an hour later, the airmen returned. Captain Armengaud unequivocal: the Germans were everywhere. They formed a semicircle within which the 2nd Army was dangerously advanced. In addition to the four army corps that had just attacked it, the garrison of Metz, emerging from the fortress, was heading towards Grand-Couronné. To Castelnau's right, Dubail's army seemed to be faring better. However, it was being pushed back along the entire length of its deployment. Its 8th Corps was in retreat, which was causing the others to retreat as well. It was therefore unable to intervene on Castelnau's behalf. Armed with this information, he no longer hesitated. At 10:30 a.m., barely four hours after the start of the battle, he ordered the retreat. The fighting would be brutal. All day long, on the left flank and in the center of the French line, the French 11th Infantry Division, known as the "Iron Division," and the 4th Chasseurs Battalion, nicknamed "the Little Hunters," fully justifying their reputation as sharpshooters, held the Germans at bay and protected the withdrawal of the units. The gunners of the 8th Artillery Regiment did not hesitate to position their 75mm guns in the front line amidst the infantry. Less than a thousand meters from the enemy, the French guns "reached zero". On the heights of Château-Salins, General Foch, imperturbable, a cigar dangling from his lips, ordered the full force of his <20th Corps heavy artillery to fire. He was one of the few to possess the modern, rapid-fire 155 C Rimailho guns. His twelve cannons established a barrage all the more impenetrable as the German heavy artillery remained in its emplacements behind the heights of Morhange. When night fell, the Chasseurs were the last to reach the lines. Taken in at the outposts, they would finally be able to eat and drink, something they hadn't done for forty-eight hours.

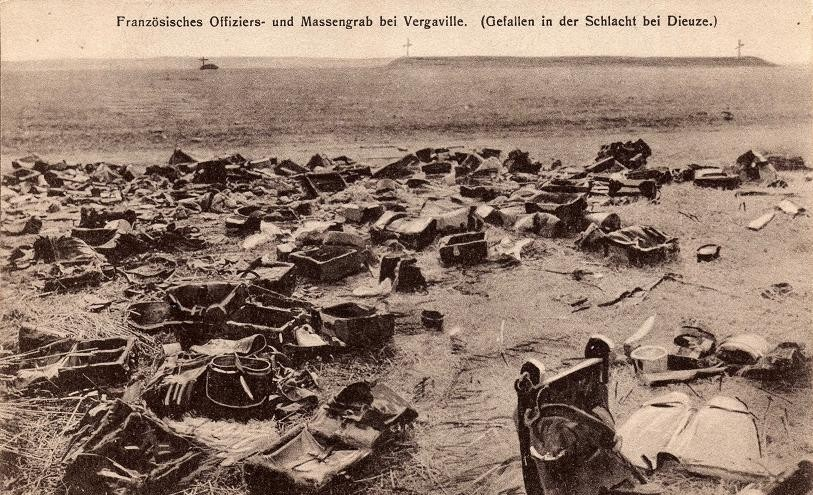
French officer's grave and mass grave at Vergaville (killed at the Battle of Dieuze).

However, the withdrawal of the 15th and 16th Army Corps was carried out in the worst possible way. Their movements were conducted without any preparation and in utter disarray. These soldiers had never learned how to manoeuvre in retreat, nor did they know how to coordinate with their artillerymen. The disengagement from the front line took place in broad daylight under the fire of German machine guns, which no artillery came to counter. It was a retreat that most often resembled a veritable flight. The withdrawal route was littered with packs and equipment, which the soldiers discarded to retreat more quickly. According to witnesses, a "sublime" disorder reigned in Dieuze. Once again, it was the Chasseurs Alpins who saved these units. The 6th, 23rd and 27th battalions of Chasseurs Alpins blocked the enemy's advance, took up positions on the heights and held until nightfall without being dislodged.

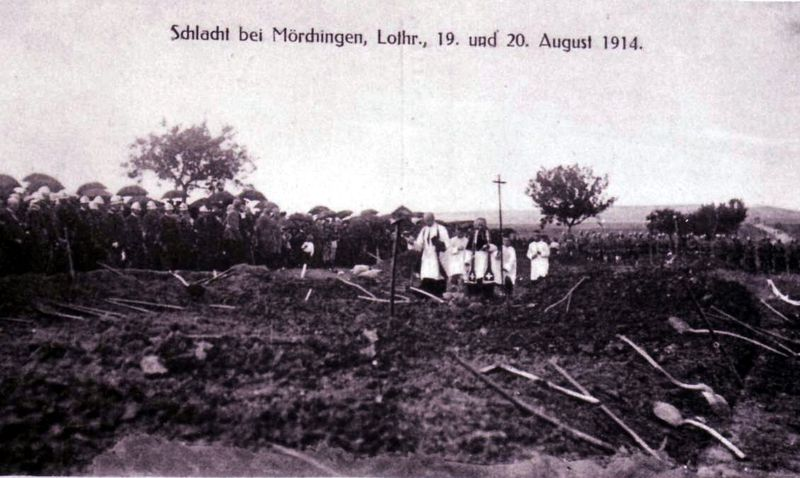
Blessing of the mass graves by Archpriest Brech and the parish priest of Riche on 25 August 1914.

Although it only lasted a few hours during the morning of August 20 this battle was terribly deadly. The French infantry's commitment in compact columns without protection under the fire of German machine guns and artillery was the cause. Witness accounts speak of waves of assault driven by the simplistic order "Forward! Forward!" as the bugles sounded the charge. Accurately quantifying French losses at Morhange is difficult, since it was only from the month of October 1914 a systematic count of the dead, wounded, and missing from the actions undertaken could not be organized. Information gathered from villagers who participated in the burials of the dead from this battlefield nevertheless allowed for an estimate of a total of 5,000 killed, of whom only 1,500 could be identified due to a fairly widespread failure to wear identification tags. As for the number of wounded, it is estimated at around 15,000, most of whom, left on the field due to the lack of a medical organization adapted to such a massacre, were taken prisoner by the Germans. Although victorious, the Germans suffered the devastating effect of the French canons de 75 guns. Their losses are estimated at around 2,000 killed, including a large number of officers, which would have serious consequences for the rest of the Lorraine campaign, particularly during the Battle of the Trouée de Charmes.

== The German strategic error ==
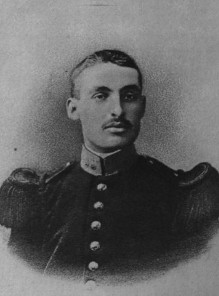
Xavier de Curières de Castelnau was a lieutenant in the army commanded by his father, General de Castelnau. He was killed during the Battle of Morhange on the evening of August 20th while covering the retreat of French troops. General de Castelnau subsequently lost two more of his sons during the conflict.

In Nancy, where he had relocated his headquarters, Castelnau expected the final defeat. A single raid by the German cavalry would have been enough to cripple his army in full retreat. For two long days, Castelnau lived in anguished uncertainty. To the desolation of defeat was added terrible news that his own son, Xavier de Curières de Castelnau, who served in the 4th Battalion of Foot Chasseurs (BCP), had been killed on the slopes of Morhange while protecting the retreat. But, against all odds, the situation would reverse. The Germans would first waste these two days trying to make a decision. No message, no instructions reached the Bavarian Crown Prince from the Oberste Heeresleitung (OHL), the German High Command surrounding Moltke in Koblenz. In a letter to his family, General von Mertz wrote: “I imagined that the days following a major battle would be more eventful […] I eagerly await some order from Supreme Command for the coming days”. The entire staff of the 6th Army was seething with impatience. Finally, during a brief telephone conversation, Lieutenant Colonel Tappen, having paused to consult General Moltke, returned to the phone and demanded: “Pursue towards Épinal; significant French forces are still in the Vosges; they must be cut off”. Whereas in their pre-war war games, the Germans had planned, in the event of a favorable situation, to limit their advance to the Meurthe River. By 23 August, this option seems outdated to them. They are looking beyond that; they now want to cross the Moselle with their two armies to complete and accelerate the encirclement of the French armies that they have begun in Belgium.

The two days lost by the OHL and the decision to force the Charmes gap would offer General de Castelnau the opportunity for a revenge far surpassing his defeat at Morhange. Indeed, he knew this region intimately: he had commanded a regiment in Nancy for five years, knew every contour of the terrain, and, by regrouping the scattered elements of his army defeated a few days earlier, knew how to ideally position his troops to, in turn, lay a trap for the Germans. On 25 August, the Battle of the Trouée de Charmes would prove a defeat for Rupprecht of Bavaria, the consequences of which would weigh heavily on subsequent events. Indeed, worried by this French reaction, Moltke decided to maintain significant forces in Lorraine, forces which would prove sorely needed at the First Battle of the Marne. Conversely, Joffre, reassured by this victory, transferred two army corps from Lorraine to reinforce his armies in the West. When the Battle of the Marne began, the French and British would then possess a substantial numerical superiority, which would prove decisive.

== Controversies ==
During and after the war, various versions of this defeat circulated in the press and controversies erupted.

=== The dark legend of the "Southerners" of the 15th Army Corps ===
In the days following the Battle of Morhange, the newspaper Le Matin published, under the byline of Auguste Gervais, senator of the Seine and member of the army commission, a damning article about the 15th Army Corps blaming its soldiers for the defeat. Clemenceau's L'Homme libre published a similar article. No one at the high command denied it, even though General Joffre himself knew perfectly well what to expect. On 22 August, a few lines to his minister, he had summarized the situation:

“Our forces, which attempted to advance from the Seille on 20 August, encountered fortified positions and were met with a fierce counter-attack by the enemy. Those advancing between Mittersheim and Marsal were never able to gain a complete foothold on the heights of the right bank. On the other hand, the corps advancing from Château-Salins. General Foch’s 20th Army Corps, was able to advance towards Morhange, perhaps a little too hastily and before the troops intended to cover its left flank had arrived. It was this corps that, attacked from the front and flank, suffered the most. The losses were serious, and it left 21 cannons in enemy hands.”.

It is clearly the 20th Corps that is implicated. The accusation against the soldiers from the South is therefore slanderous. But, at this stage of the war, there is no question of incriminating such a prestigious leader as General Foch who, moreover, so effectively protected the retreat of the entire French 2nd Army and contributed to saving it.

=== General Foch's disobedience ===
Another controversy arose after the Armistice. This time, the alleged disobedience of General Foch during the battle was called into question. The attack orders he gave to his army corps on the morning of 20 August 1914. are indeed in violation of the instructions that Castelnau had sent him the previous evening. This fact is established, and there is now a broad consensus among historians that there was indeed disobedience. Post-war English historians would stigmatize this, going so far as to speak of a "grave disaster" that jeopardized not only the local situation but the outcome of the war. The Germans were considered no less guilty, as evidenced by Colonel von Ruth, former chief of staff of the 7th Division. Foch can now be considered responsible for the defeat at Morhange, instead of his superior, Castelnau, whom Foch reportedly called "the vanquished of Morhange". During the war, this act of disobedience destroyed the relationship between Foch and Castelnau. No one thought to mention this incident at the time, so thoroughly did General Foch subsequently establish himself as one of the finest French military leaders. Curiously, after the war, it was Foch himself who brought it up. Given that he enjoyed immense prestige and profound respect from his fellow citizens at that time, due to the prominent role he had played in the Allied victory, it is surprising that he felt the need to justify himself regarding a practically forgotten battle from the beginning of the war. He published a lengthy account of the fighting at Morhange, in which, portraying himself in a favorable light, he took considerable liberties with historical fact. In particular, he claimed not to have received orders from his superior at the time, General de Castelnau. His statements and description of the events are unverifiable because the archives concerning this battle are not available at that time. General de Castelnau, implicated in this article, refused the right of reply offered to him by La Revue des Deux Mondes. He merely stated that he found it indecent for leaders to put on such a show and made a date with history for the time when the archives would be published. In private, he simply found it "childish", the explanation provided by Marshal Foch – has an army order ever been “lost” in the middle of a battle. The mystery of this disobedience remains unsolved a hundred years after the events.

== See also ==
=== Bibliography ===
- Becker, Jean-Jacques (2006). "Le plan XVII et la Première Guerre mondiale" [Plan XVII and the First World War]. In Lindemann, Thomas; Martin, Michel Louis (eds.). Les militaires et le recours à la force armée faucons, colombes? [The military and the use of armed force: hawks or doves?]. Pouvoirs comparés (in French). Paris: L'Harmattan. pp. 87–96. ISBN 2-296-00484-9.
- Chenu, Benoît (2017). Castelnau (in French). Paris: Bernard Giovanangeli éditeur. p. 446. ISBN 978-2-7587-0204-7. OCLC 1022926635.
- Deuringer, Karl (2014). The first battle of the First World War. Translated by Terence Zuber. New York: The History Press. p. 398. ISBN 978-0-7524-6086-4. OCLC 877846785.
- Renaud, Patrick-Charles (2014). La guerre à coups d'hommes : la bataille des frontières de l'Est : Lorraine, août-septembre 1914 (in French). Paris: Grancher. p. 431. ISBN 978-2-7339-1297-3. OCLC 878360726. PCR2014.
- Huet, Jean-Paul (2013). Édouard de Castelnau, 1851-1944 (in French). Turquant: Anovi. p. 115. ISBN 978-2-914818-63-6.
- Le Naour, Jean-Yves (2011). Désunion nationale (in French). Paris: Éditions Vendémiaire. p. 190. ISBN 978-2-36358-003-0.
- Le Naour, Jean-Yves (2010). "Il en restera toujours quelque chose ? Solder les comptes de la rumeur du XVe corps". Cahiers de la Méditerranée (81): 253–263.
- Mistre, Maurice (2009). La légende noire du 15e Corps d'armée. Un territoire et des hommes (in French). Saint-Michel-l'Observatoire: C'est-à-dire éd. p. 239. ISBN 978-2-9527564-7-1..
- Notin, Jean-Christophe (2018). Foch (in French). Paris: Perrin. p. 640. ISBN 978-2-262-07695-5. OCLC 1066740119.
- Didier, Jacques (2003). Échec à Morhange (in French). Louviers: Ysec. p. 240. ISBN 2-84673-021-0.
- Gras, Yves (1990). Castelnau, ou, L'art de commander (in French). Paris: Denoël. p. 466. ISBN 978-2-207-23673-4.
- Greenhalgh, Elizabeth (2013). "Chapitre premier. De l'école de guerre à la Lorraine en août 1914". Foch, chef de guerre (in French). Tallandier. pp. 21–38. doi:10.3917/talla.green.2013.01. ISBN 979-10-210-0272-2.
- von Mertz, Général (1934). La volonté du chef expliquée à la lumière des évènements qui se sont passés à l'état-major du commandement en chef commun dans les pays d'empire (in French). Translated by Colonel Louis Kœltz. Paris: Payot. p. 224. OCLC 369163548.
- Naërt, Maurice; Lefranc; Laxague, Gratien; Courbis, Jean (1922–1934). Les armées françaises dans la Grande guerre (4 tomes divisés en 30 volumes). Paris: Impr. nationale. :
  - Les armées françaises dans la Grande guerre. Vol. 1. 1936. p. 602.
  - Les armées françaises dans la Grande guerre. Vol. 1. 1922. p. 1026.
- von Bayern (Kronprinz), Rupprecht (1929). Mein Kriegstagebuch (3 volumes) (in German). Munich: Deutscher Nationalverlag. LCCN 49055720.
- André Bellard, De Nancy à Nancy via Morhange et Vitrimont, Metz et Nancy, Imprimerie de Lorraine, 1929.
- Picheral, Louis (1922). De Lagarde à Dieuze. Nîmes: Impr. régionale. p. 32. et BnF 31105089g
- Bataille de Morhange (août 1914). Metz: Impr. lorraine. 1921. p. 40.
- Belleudy, Jules (1921). Que faut-il penser du 15e corps ?. Menton: Impr. coopérative. p. 356.
- Montagnon, Pierre (2013). Dictionnaire de la Grande Guerre (in French). Paris: Pygmalion, département de Flammarion. p. 941. ISBN 978-2-7564-0833-0.

=== External links ===
- Chaine dédiée au général de Castelnau sur YouTube
- Chaine dédiée aux 600 000 soldats et officiers ayant participé à la bataille de Lorraine d'août et septembre 1914 et, notamment, à ceux qui ont combattu durant la « Bataille de Morhange »
- "Carte de situation de la bataille de Morhange 20 août matin". memoiredeshommes.sga.defense.gouv.fr. 1915..
- "La bataille de Morhange (18 au 20 août 1914). La situation de la 2e Armée française »". chtimiste.com..
- Promotion « Castelnau » de l'École Spéciale Militaire à Morhange

=== Related articles ===
- List of military engagements of World War I
- Battle of Lorraine
- The 15th Body Case
- German military cemetery of Morhange
- 1914 French mobilization
- 1914 German mobilization
- Replacement Army
