= Cross of Saarburg =

Cross and memorial in Germany

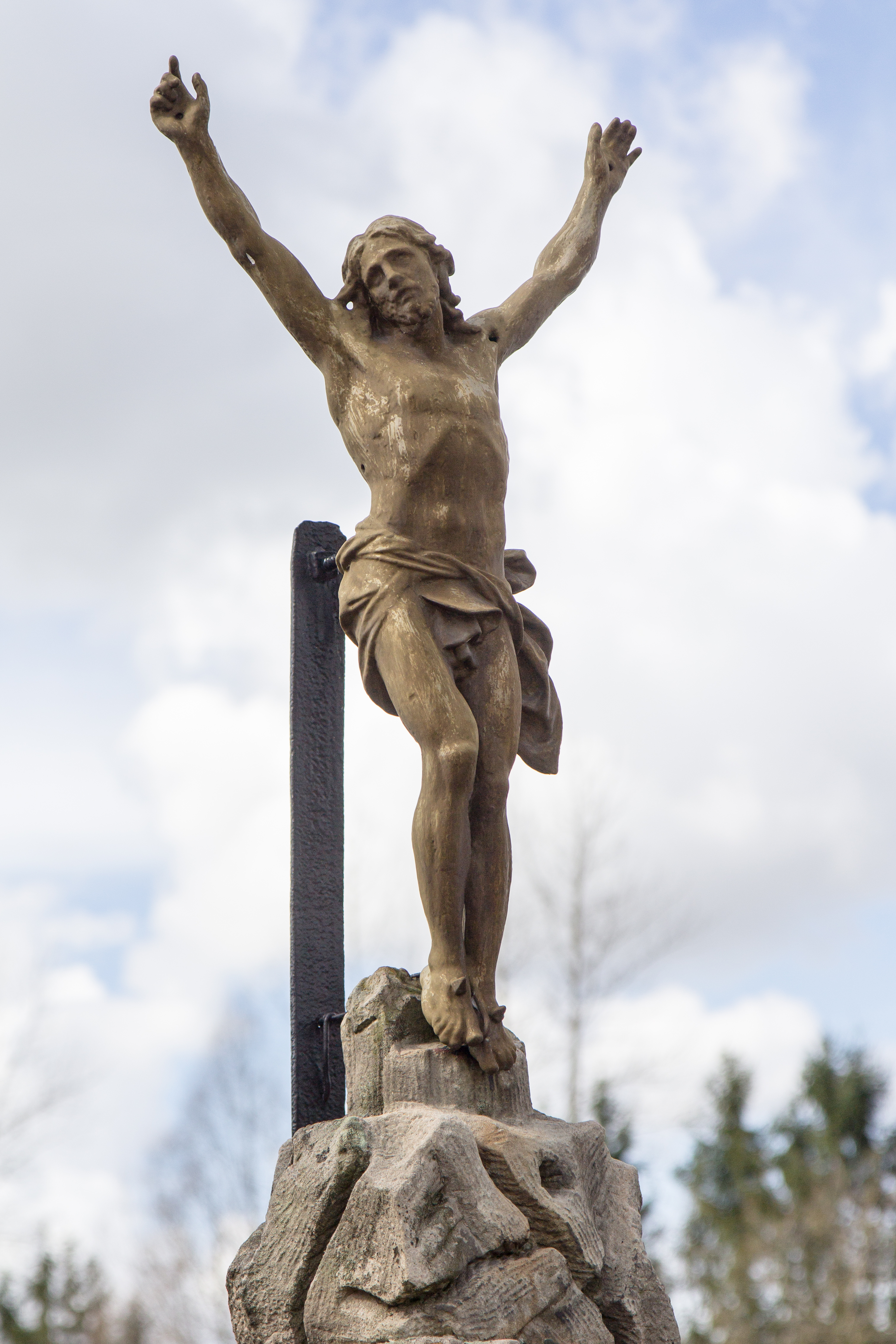
“Cross of Saarburg”, 2018

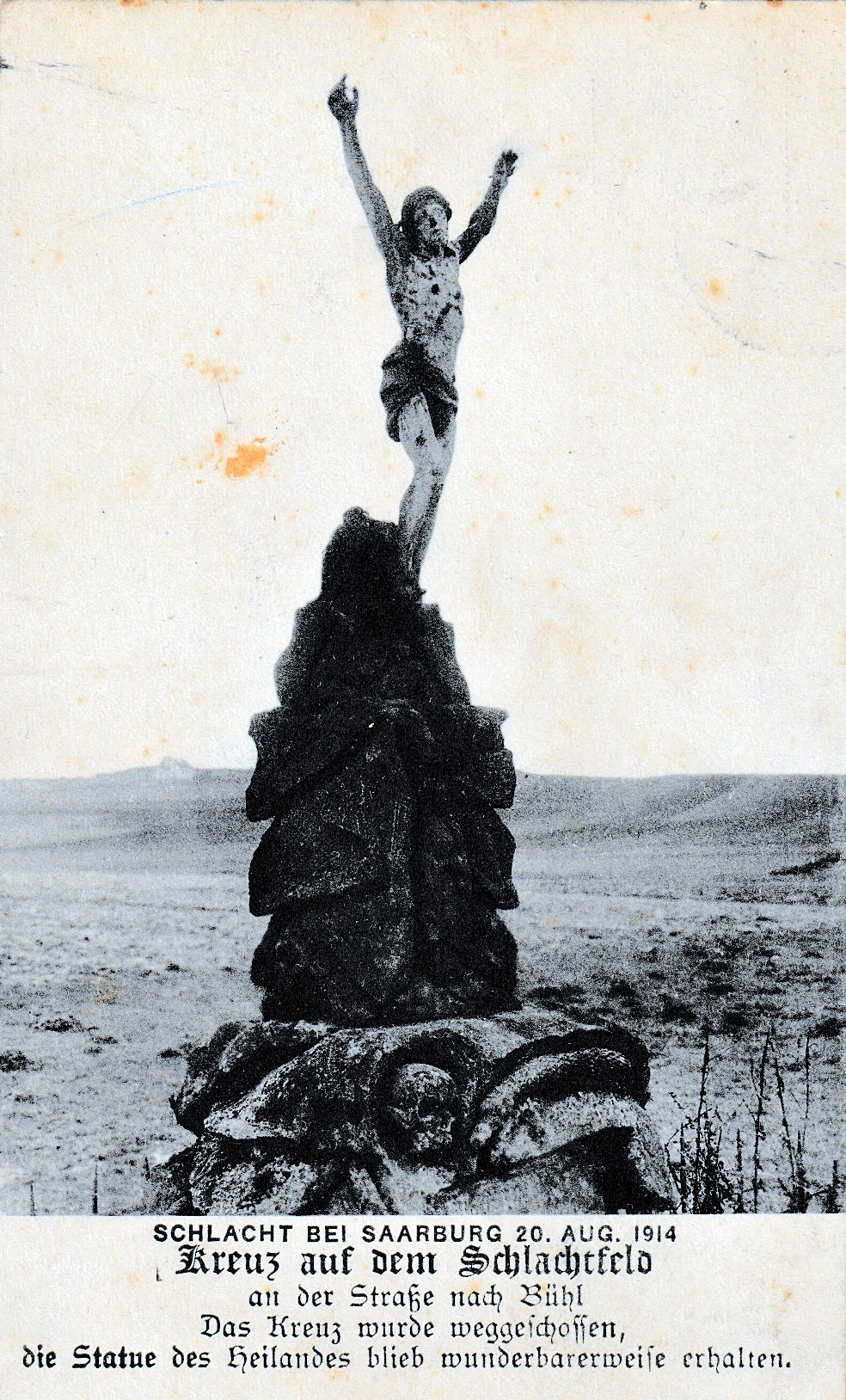
Contemporary postcard with photo of the cross (metal rod on the back retouched)

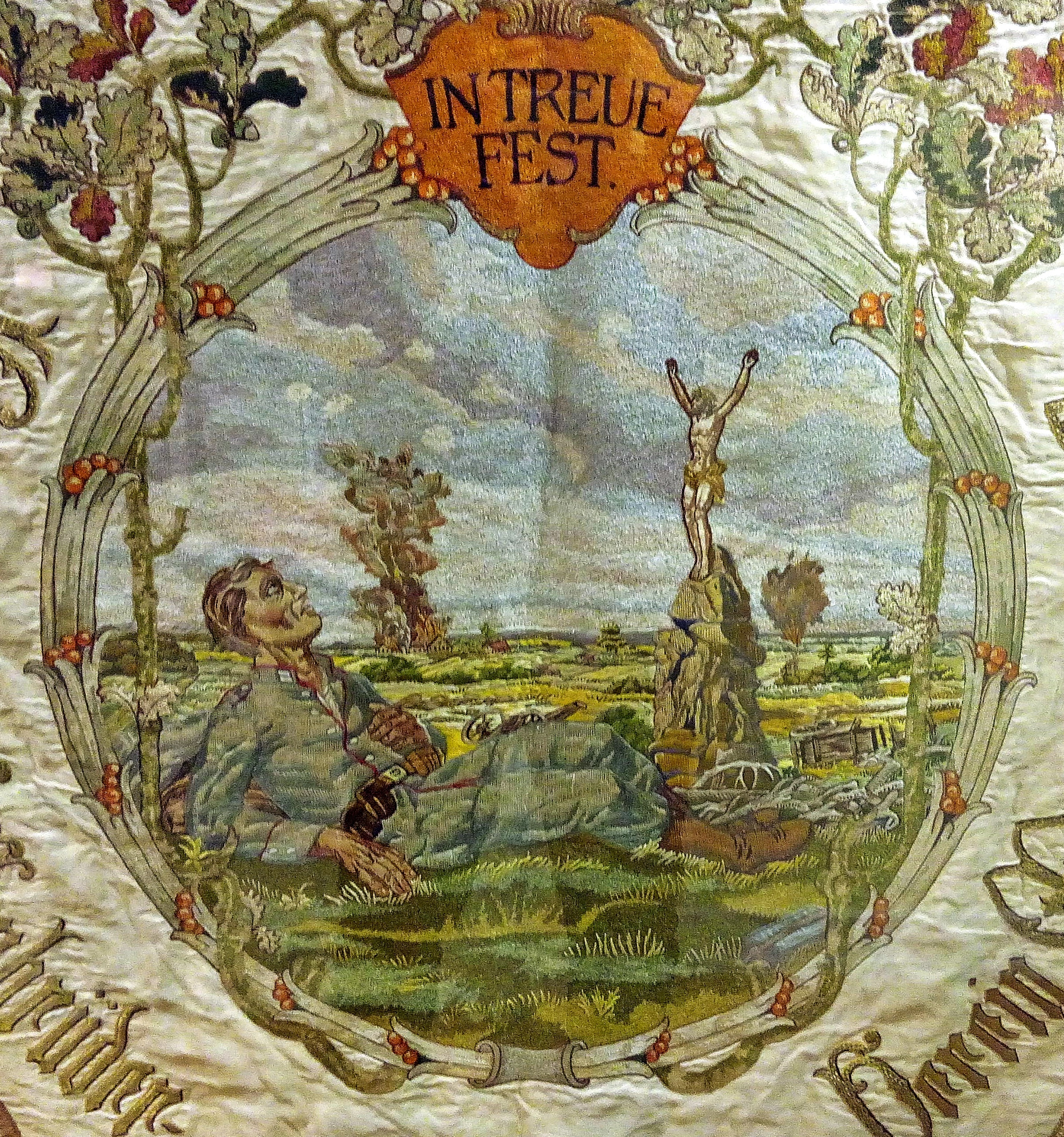
Representation of the cross on the historic veterans' association flag of Mühlheim an der Eis

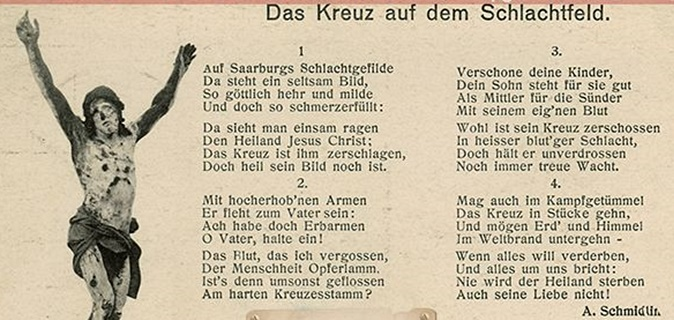
The Cross with the song by August Schmidlin

The Cross of Saarburg (French: Croix de Buhl; German: Kreuz von Saarburg) is a field cross in Buhl-Lorraine, which became a popular postcard and flag motif because of its special history during the First World War.

== Story ==
As the inscription on the base indicates, the cross was donated in 1875 by Nicolaus Schiwi and Margarete Schiwi (née Fillinger), who lived in Buhl/Bühl. Until the outbreak of the First World War, it was just one of many wayside crosses in Lorraine. It is located on the road from Buhl to Sarrebourg (now Route départementale No. 96).

As part of the Battle of Lorraine, the Battle of Sarrebourg took place here in August 1914. French troops had advanced into what was then German territory on this sector of the front and were repulsed with heavy casualties. During this fighting, on 20 August 1914, a grenade or rather a shrapnel hit the aforementioned wayside cross. The wooden cross made of massive beams was completely torn away. Only the stone figure of the Savior remained upright and intact on its base. It did, however, have slight support in the form of a metal rod on the back, although this has been airbrushed out in most images.

From the very beginning, the standing Christ, whose cross had been destroyed in the war, was seen as a shocking memorial. Many soldiers spoke about it and the monument was distributed in a variety of images, as postcards, prints and devotional pictures. It was called the "Cross of Saarburg". Since it was primarily Bavarian troops that fought in the Battle of Saarburg, the motif also appears again and again on the flags of Bavarian veterans' associations. The veterans' association of Bodenkirchen (Lower Bavaria) visited the cross depicted on its flag in 2014. The motif is also embroidered on the historic flag of the veterans' and brothers-in-arms association in Mühlheim an der Eis in the Palatinate (now the Altes Rathaus Grünstadt).

During the Second World War, the Lorraine poet August Schmidlin composed a song referring to the cross, in German and French. The German version can be sung to the melody "O Haupt voll Blut und Wunden" (O Sacred Head, Now Wounded); it was also distributed on postcards.

The writer Hanna Vogt-Vilseck published a ballad on the Saarburg Cross, which is printed in the 2nd volume of the work Our Bavarians in the Field (Munich 1915, p. 1348).

Friedrich Ernst Koch created a play entitled The Cross of Saarburg in 1918.

The collection of the Bavarian Army Museum includes a devotional image with a sculptural representation of the Savior figure.

During the First World War and the Weimar Republic, the Cross of Saarburg was very well known, but today it is largely forgotten.

== The Cross ==
The symbol is based a simple wayside cross from the 19th century. The base and the figure of Christ are made of stone. The cross itself was made of wooden beams. The base also contains a statue of the Immaculate Conception. The monument still exists today in the same condition (without the cross) as it emerged from the Battle of Saarburg. The base bears the inscription:

"Erected to the glory of God by Nicolaus Schiwi and Margarete Fillinger, Bühl, in 1875. 40 days of indulgence are granted if one prays 5 Our Fathers, 5 Hail Marys, and the Faith."

A memorial stone was erected next to the cross. It bears the French and German inscription:

"In the Battle of Saarburg, August 20, 1914, this image of Christ was miraculously preserved while the cross's trunk was shot away. I am the resurrection and the life. John 11:25"

Or:

In der Schlacht von SAARBURG, 20. August 1914, wurde dieses Christusbild wunderbarerweise erhalten, während der Kreuzesstamm weggeschossen wurde. Ich bin die Auferstehung und das Leben. Joh. 11, 25

The cross and memorial stone are enclosed by a metal grille.

== Gallery of historical postcards ==
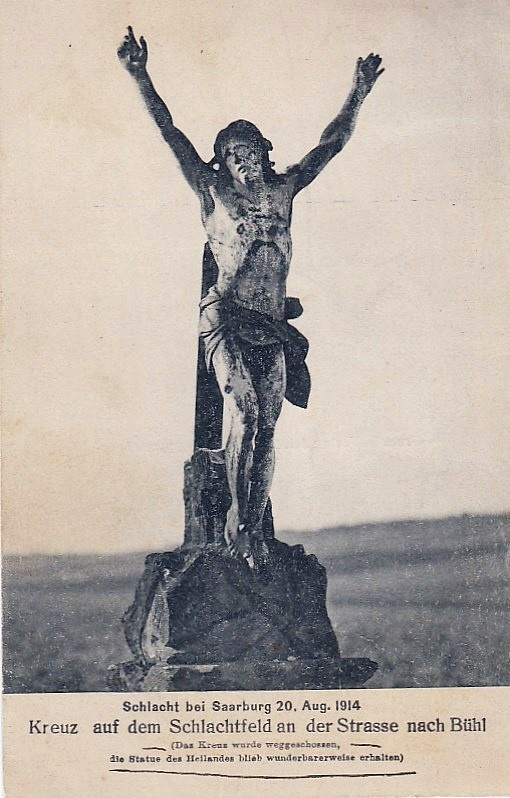
Photo of the cross, with visible metal support

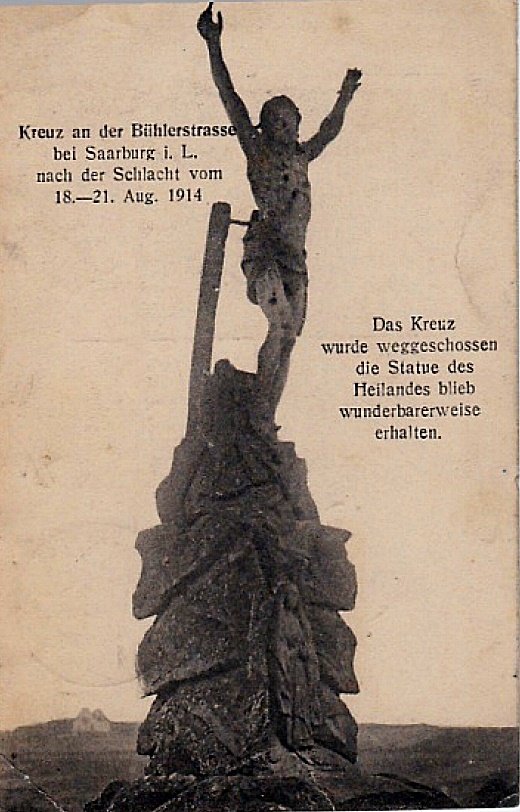
Photo of the cross, with visible metal support

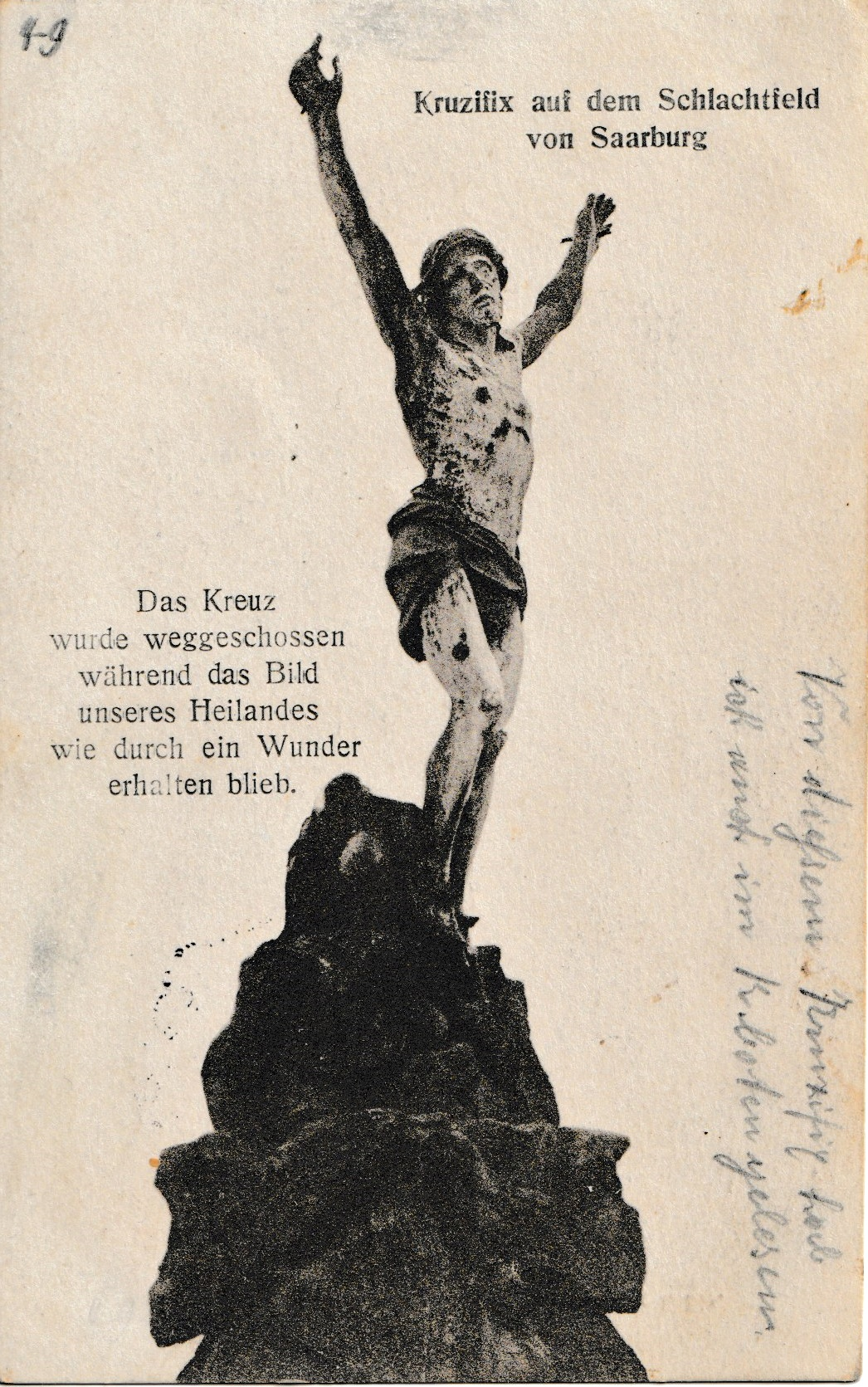
Photo of the cross, metal support retouched

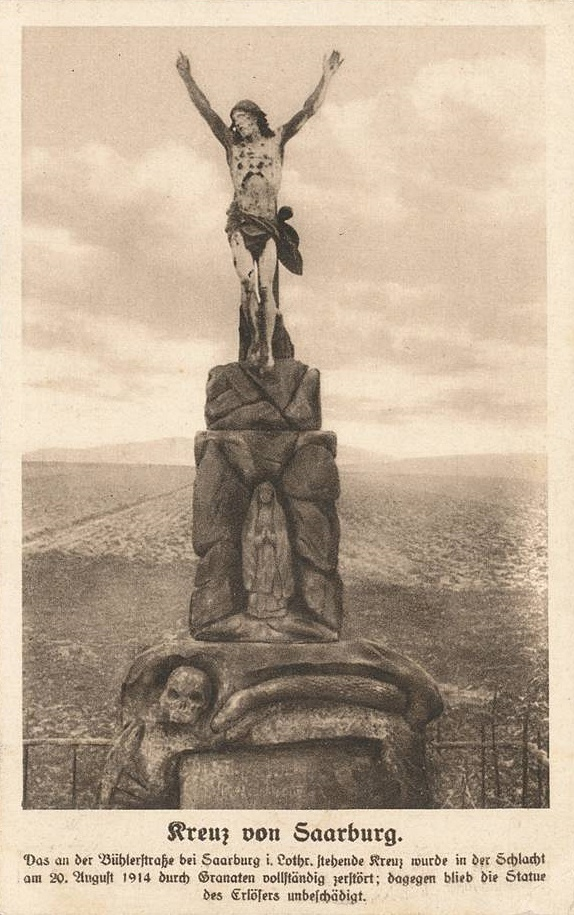

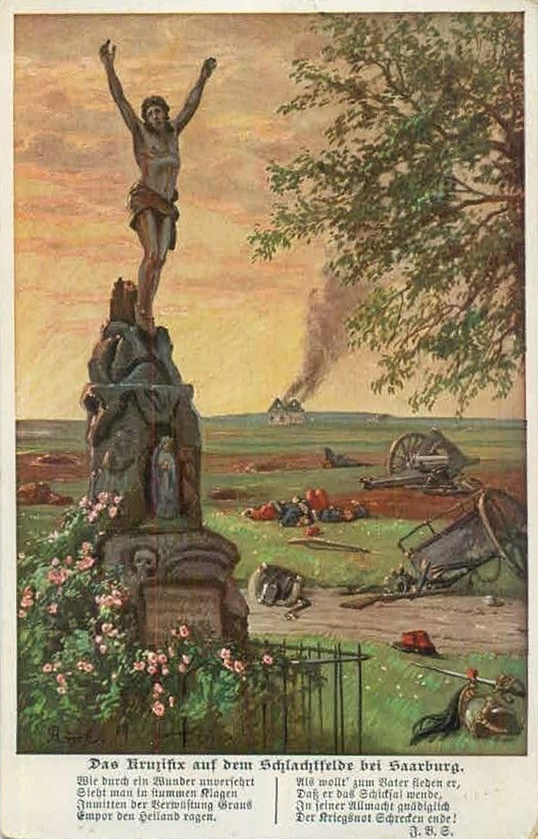

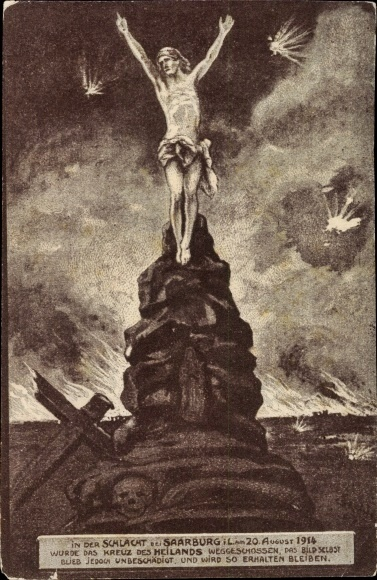

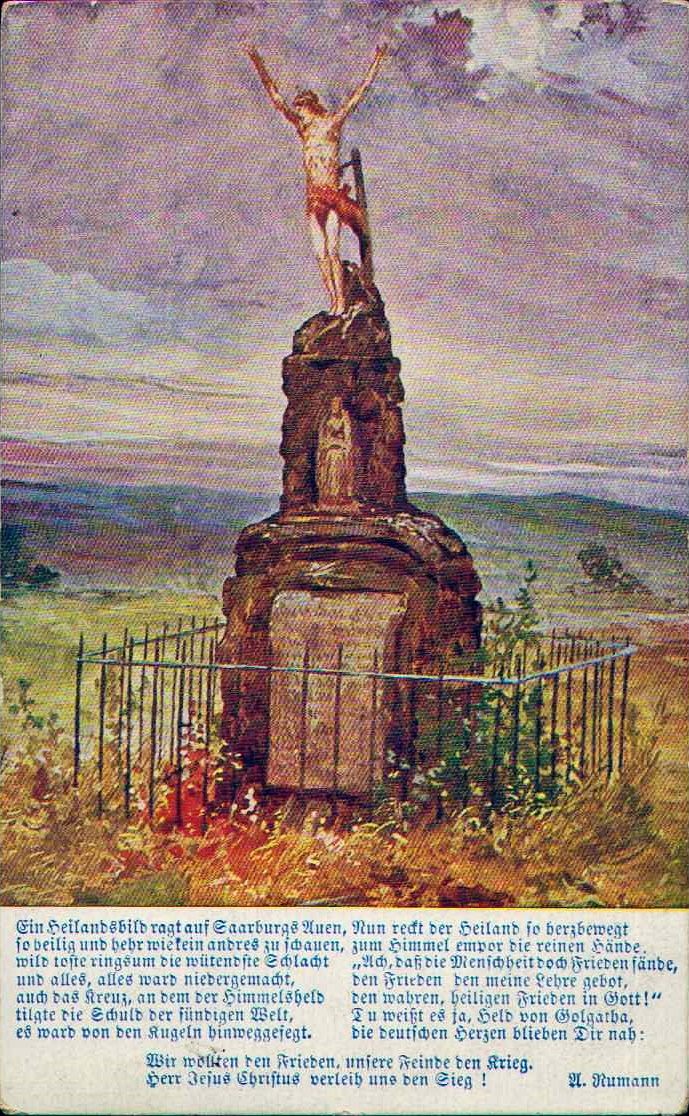

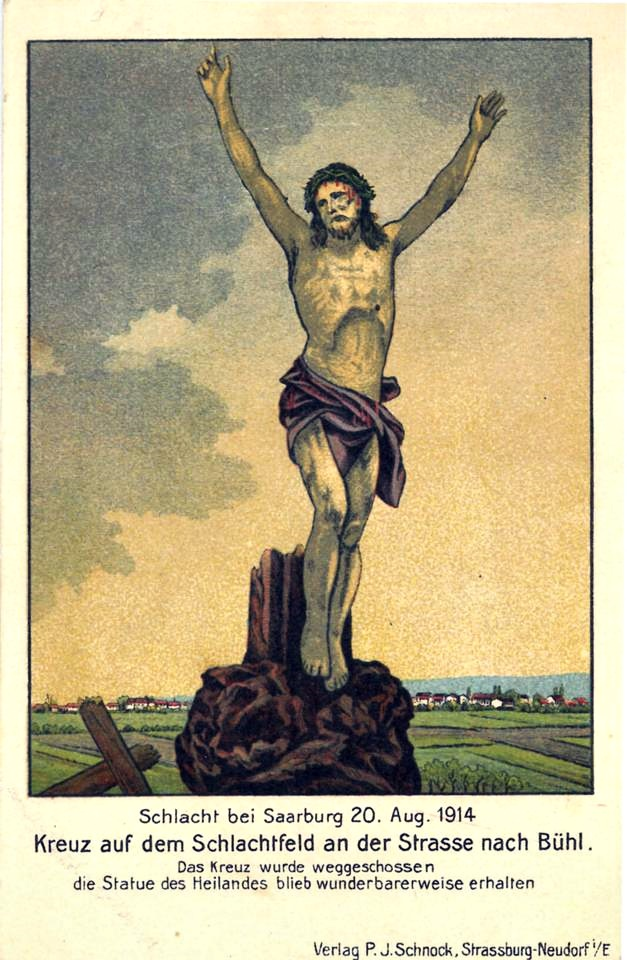

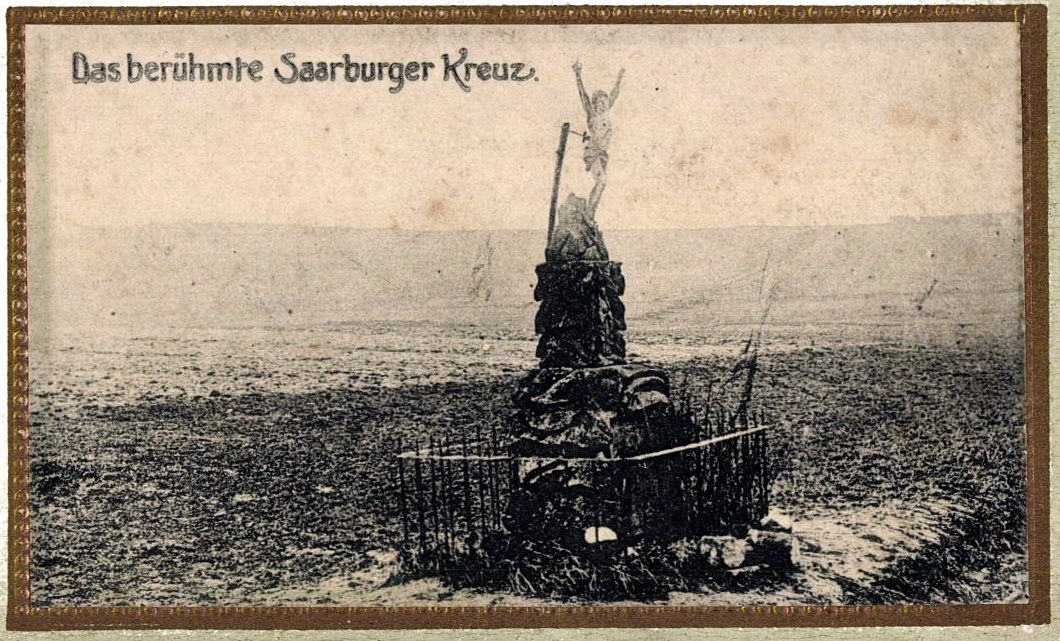
General view, 1914

== Literature ==
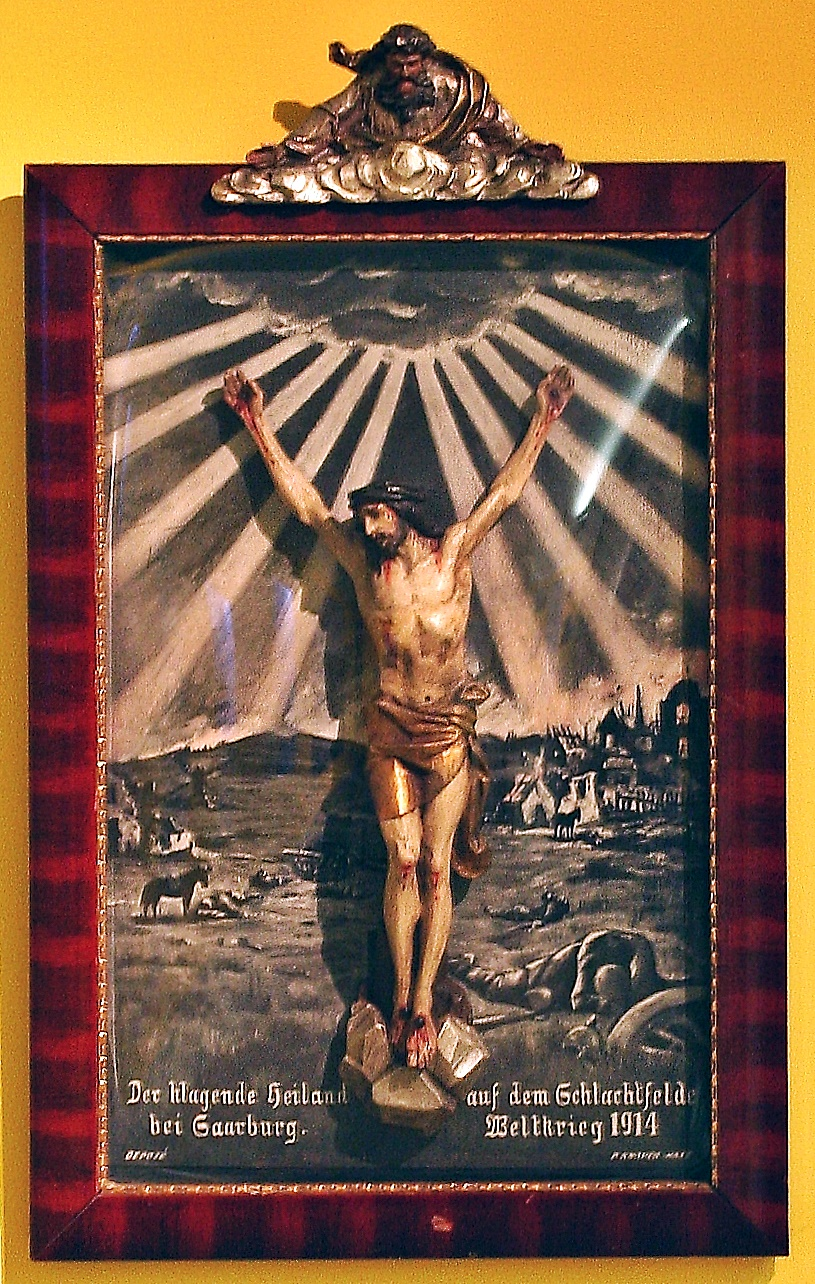
Plastic representation of the Saarburg Savior figure, in the collection of the Bayerischen Armeemuseums

- Alena Wagnerová (2014-12-12). "Das Kruzifix ohne Kreuz". Neue Zürcher Zeitung.
- Heidrun Alzheimer (Hrsg.): Glaubenssache Krieg: religiöse Motive auf Bildpostkarten des Ersten Weltkriegs. Verlag Fränkisches Freilandmuseum, Bad Windsheim 2009, ISBN 978-3-926834-70-6, S. 201–207. (Ausschnittscans).
- Eberhard Buchner: Der Weltkrieg 1914/15 in der Darstellung der zeitgenössischen Presse. Band 6. Albert Langen Verlag, München 1915, S. 131. (Ausschnittscan).
- Helmut Lissmann: Liesbet Dill: Eine Schriftstellerin aus dem Saarland (1877–1962). BoD – Books on Demand, Norderstedt 2009, ISBN 978-3-8370-3254-3, S. 151. (Digitalscan).
- Herman Niethammer: Die Geschichte des Württembergischen Infanterie-Regiments Nr. 479 und seiner Stammtruppen. 1923, S. 5. (Ausschnittscan 1); (Ausschnittscan 2).
- Paul Jaeger: Zwei Schicksalsfragen. Verlag der Christlichen Welt, 1916, S. 39. (Ausschnittscan).
- Karl Kraus: Die letzten Tage der Menschheit – ein ganzseitiges Foto des Kreuzes von Saarburg ist am Ende des Buches eingefügt.
