= Battle of Sarrebourg =

1914 battle of World War I

- Part of Battle of the Frontiers (First World War)
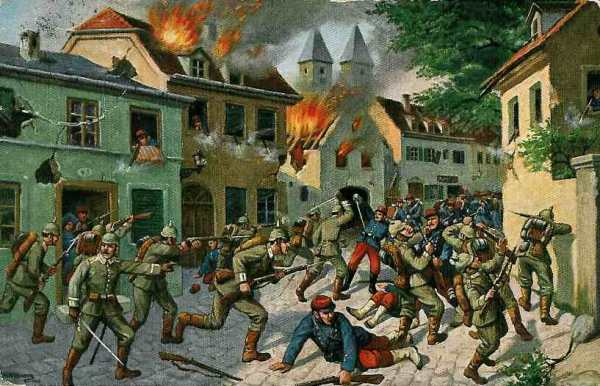
- Fighting at Sarrebourg on 20 August 1914
Date	18 to 20 August 1914
Location	Sarrebourg, Lorraine, German Empire 48.735278°N 7.054444°E
Result	German victory

Belligerents
France	German Empire

Commanders and leaders
Augustin Dubail	Rupprecht, Crown Prince of Bavaria

Units involved
1st Army	7th Army
- 6,700 killed in total, injured.

The Battle of Sarrebourg, (French: Bataille de Sarrebourg) (German: Schlacht bei Saarburg), was one of the first major battles of the First World War during its first phase during the Battle of the Frontiers. It took place in the city of Sarrebourg from 18 to 20 August 1914.

Alongside the Battle of Morhange, in the south-east of the current Moselle department, the Battle of Sarrebourg pitted the French 1st Army of General Dubail against the German 7th Army. These two battles ended in French defeats against the troops of Rupprecht of Bavaria, now nicknamed the "Victor of Metz".

== Context ==
After 1871, the city of Sarrebourg became part of the German Empire within Alsace-Lorraine. In order to protect the crossing point to Strasbourg via the Saverne pass, German troops entrenched themselves as soon as war was declared, and until the fights of 20 and 21 August 1914, on the foothills of the Saar valley north and east of Sarrebourg.

== The Battle of Sarrebourg ==
The main French offensive in the south begins on 14 August 1914, when the 1st Army (commanded by General Auguste Dubail) advanced with two corps in the Northern Vosges and two corps to the northeast towards Sarrebourg, while the two right flank corps of the 2nd Army (General Noël Édouard) advanced to the left of the First Army. One corps and the second group of reserve divisions advanced slowly towards Morhange, as a flank guard against a German attack from Metz. The First Army had taken several passes further south since 8 August, to protect the southern flank as the army advanced towards Donon and Sarrebourg.

Despite warnings from General Joseph Joffre, who opposed the separation of the armies, the army was forced to advance towards the Vosges passes to the south-east, east towards the Donon and north-east towards Sarrebourg. The German troops withdrew during the day, the Donon was taken and on the left flank, an advance of 10 to 12 km was made. At dusk, the 26th Infantry Division of the 13th Army Corps attacked Cirey-sur-Vezouze. They entered under German artillery and machine gun fire which managed to push back the French and caused them many losses. On 15 August, the Second Army reported that German long-range artillery was able to bombard French artillery and infantry undisturbed and that German infantry had inflicted many casualties on the French during their attacks.

The Second Army had to attack methodically after artillery preparation, but managed to push the Germans back. Intelligence reports identified a main line of resistance of the German 6th Army and the 7th Army (united under the command of Crown Prince Rupprecht of Bavaria) close to the advancing French troops and perceived that a counteroffensive was imminent. On 16 August, the Germans opposed the advance with long-range artillery fire and the 17 August while the First Army reinforced the advance on Sarrebourg.

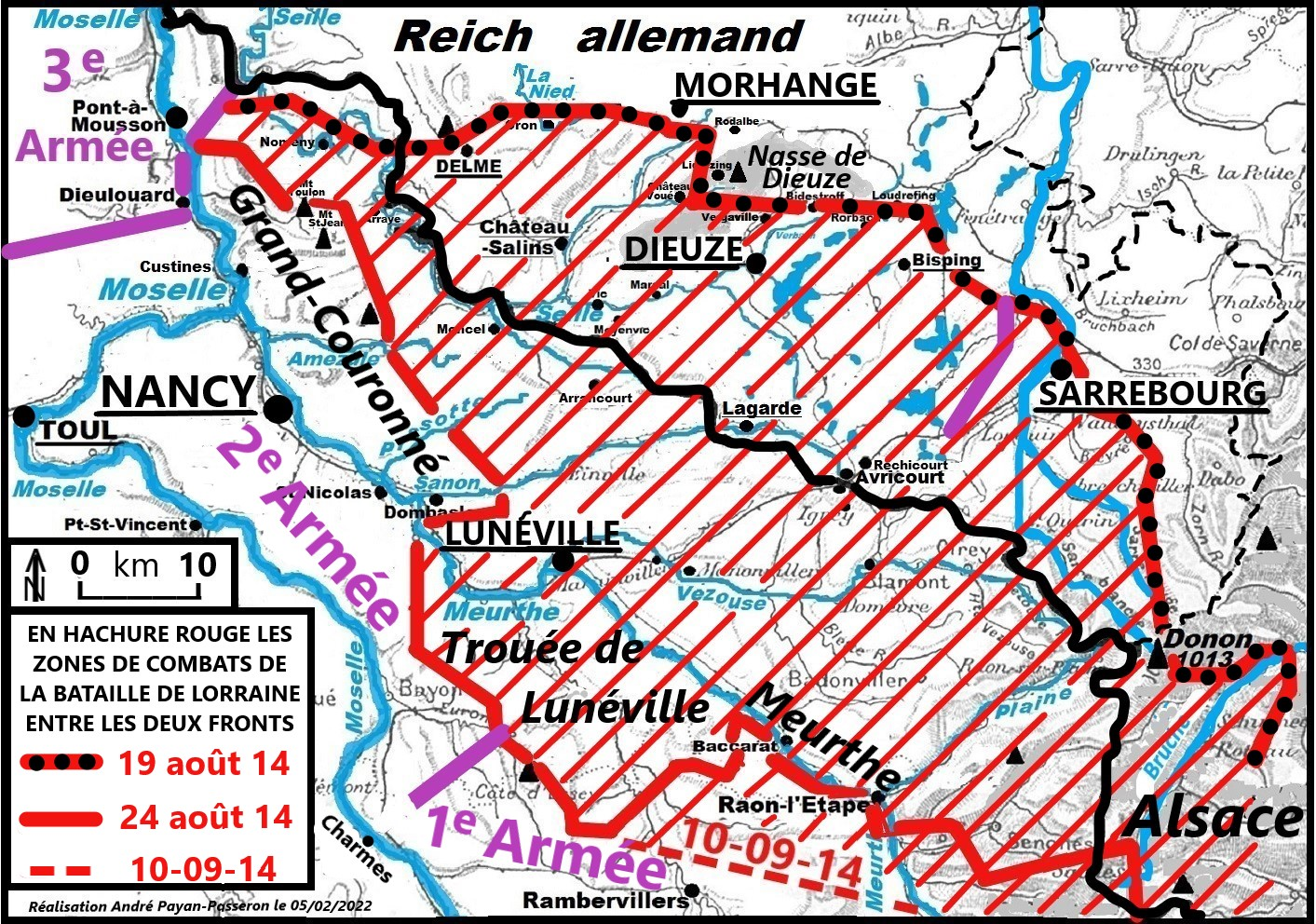
In red hatching the combat zones in Lorraine from 5 August to 15 September 1914.

On 20 August 1914, at around 2pm., the Germans crossed the canal on makeshift footbridges under heavy fire from French artillery and were pushed back. When the Germans left the city, Joffre ordered the Second Army to move further north, which accentuated the divergence within the French armies which were withdrawing from the 20 to 23 August.

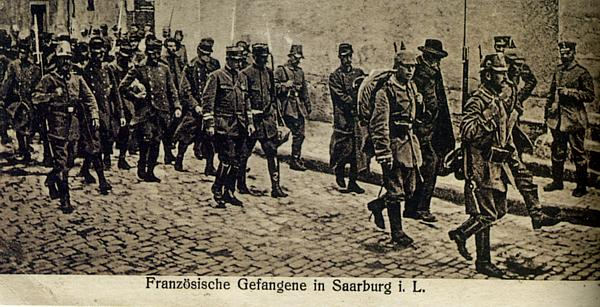
French prisoners in Sarrebourg.

A German counterattack, On 20 August 1914, forced the unfolding of separate battles against the French armies, which were defeated and routed. The German pursuit was slow enabling Castelnau to occupy positions east of Nancy and extend the right wing to the south, to regain contact with the 1st Army. During the day of 22 August 1914, the right flank was attacked and pushed back 25km from the position where the offensive had begun on 14 August. The First Army withdrew, but managed to maintain contact with the Second Army. Between the 24 and 26 August, the two French armies repulsed the German offensive during the Battle of the Trouée de Charmes and recaptured the line of 14 August at the beginning of September 1914.

== Losses ==
The fighting between 19 and 21 August 1914 resulted in nearly 6,700 French and German soldiers being killed. The bodies were then hastily buried, partly by the civilian population.

== Bibliography ==
- Payan-Passeron, André (2021). La bataille de Lorraine d'août et septembre 1914 (21x30 cm, de la stratégie défensive à la doctrine de l'offensive à outrance avec l'analyse croisée des stratégies internes et externes françaises et allemandes de 1871 à 1914 (pages 15 à 47), en Belgique, dans le Nord et en Lorraine évolution des fronts, des opérations et des pertes du début août au 15 septembre 1914 en 160 cartes couleur explicatives de la main de l'auteur et en 21 tableaux à données comparatives chiffrées). Paris: Éditions L'Harmattan. p. 424. ISBN 978-2-343-25132-5.
- Payan-Passeron, André (2024). Contrevérités sur la Grande Guerre. Paris: Les Impliqués Éditeur (Groupe L'Harmattan). p. 189. ISBN 978-2-38541-999-8
- Karl Deuringer (1929). Die Schlacht in Lothringen und in den Vogesen 1914. hrsg. vom Bayerischen Kriegsarchiv (in German). Vol. 2. Munich: Schick. p. 893..
- Joseph Elmerich (2004). Août 1914 : La bataille de Sarrebourg (in French). Sarrebourg..
- Olivier Monier (2011). Mort des soldats et traitement des corps des combattants tombés pendant la Première Guerre mondiale dans la région de Sarrebourg de 1914 à nos jours (in French). Strasbourg: Université de Strasbourg..
- Nouzille, Jean; Raymond Oberlé; Francis Rapp (1989). Batailles d'Alsace (in French). Strasbourg: Contades..

== See also ==
- Battle of Lorraine from 5 August to 15 September 1914
- Cross of Saarburg
