= Sarrebourg =

Sarrebourg Saarbuerj (Lorraine Franconian) Saarburg (German)
- Subprefecture and commune
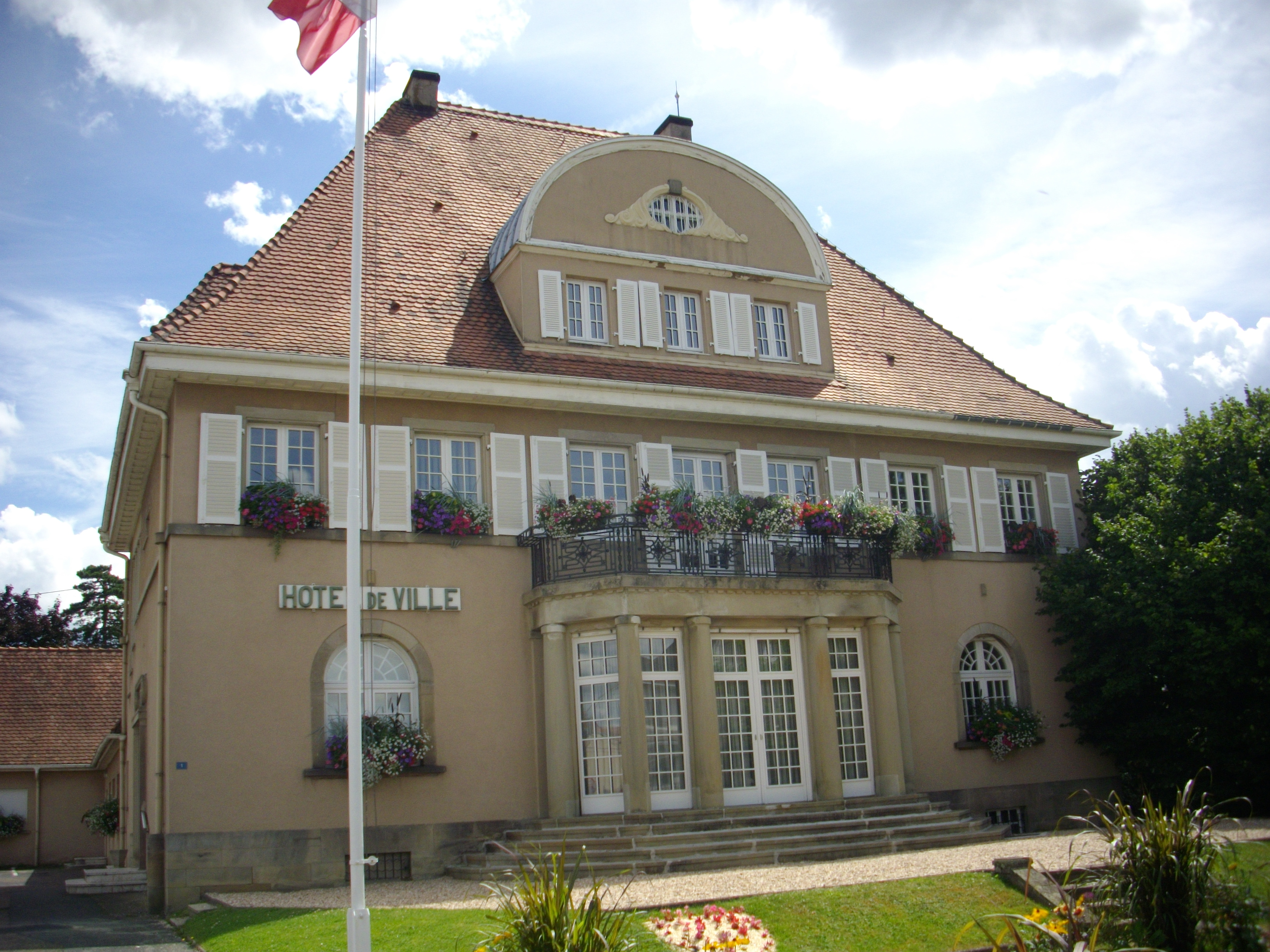
- The former town hall in Sarrebourg

- Coat of arms
- Location of Sarrebourg
- Location within France Location within Grand Est
- Coordinates: 48°44′N 7°03′E
- Country: France
- Region: Grand Est
- Department: Moselle
- Arrondissement: Sarrebourg-Château-Salins
- Canton: Sarrebourg
- Intercommunality: Sarrebourg - Moselle Sud

Government
  - Mayor (2020–2026): Alain Marty
- Area^{1}: 16.40 km^{2} (6.33 sq mi)
- Population (2023): 12,170
  - Density: 742.1/km^{2} (1,922/sq mi)
- Time zone: UTC+01:00 (CET)
  - Summer (DST): UTC+02:00 (CEST)
- INSEE/Postal code: 57630 /57400
- ^{1} French Land Register data, which excludes lakes, ponds, glaciers > 1 km^{2} (0.386 sq mi or 247 acres) and river estuaries.

Sarrebourg (French pronunciation: [saʁbuʁ]; also German: Saarburg, pronounced [ˈzaːɐ̯bʊʁk]; Lorraine Franconian: Saarbuerj; older Latin: Pons Saravi) is a commune of northeastern France.

In 1895 a Mithraeum was discovered at Sarrebourg at the mouth of the pass leading from the Vosges Mountains.

== Geography ==
Sarrebourg is located in the department of Moselle, Lorraine, administrative region of Grand Est.

It lies in on the upper course of the river Saar. The Vosges mountains are located about 10 kilometers south of the locality.

To the northwest, the Oberwald forest massif - where the state forest of the municipality is located.

It is 54 km away from Strasbourg, 64 km from Nancy, 77 km from Metz and 345 km from Paris (orthodromic distance).

=== Lines of communication and transport ===
Sarrebourg station has rail connections to Paris, Strasbourg, Metz and Nancy.

The commune is on the route of the Route nationale 4.

Sarrebourg is the departure point of several departmental roads: D 27 to Morhange, D 43 to Sarre-Union, D 44 to Le Donon and Schirmeck, D 45 to Dabo and Walscheid.

The agglomération de Sarrebourg has a public transport network called iSibus. It was inaugurated by the Communauté de communes de l'agglomération de Sarrebourg on 16 September 2009. The network has two regular bus connections.

=== Bicycle paths and walking trails ===
The EuroVelo 5 cycling route passes to the south of the municipality. It is possible to reach Strasbourg, via Lutzelbourg and Saverne, by following the Marne–Rhine Canal.

The old railroad tracks in the direction of Abreschviller and Troisfontaines have been converted into bicycle paths. Other bicycle paths have been created towards Bébing, Haut-Clocher and Sarraltroff.

The circulaire de la Sarre walking trail is located on the municipality territory.

The commune is the starting point of the GR 533 footpath.

== Population ==
Historical population
Year	Pop.	±% p.a.
1968	11,413	—
1975	12,615	+1.44%
1982	12,699	+0.09%
1990	13,311	+0.59%
1999	13,330	+0.02%
2007	12,786	−0.52%
2012	12,386	−0.63%
2017	12,045	−0.56%
2023	12,170	+0.17%
Source: INSEE

== History ==
=== Antiquity ===
The first mention of a settlement on the present site of Sarrebourg was found in the Tabula Peutingeriana. The town is referred to as Ponte Saravi, located between Ad Decem Pagos (Tarquimpol) and Tabernis (Saverne) on the edge of the Silva Vosagus, the present-day Vosges mountains.

The Antonine Itinerary, a second, later Roman source, refers to the place as Ponte Sarvix.

From a toponymic aspect, the meaning of 'Ponte Saravi' and 'Ponte Sarvix' is "a bridge over the Saar". This is why scholars have named the ancient city of Sarrebourg "Pont de la Sarre", i.e. Pons - the Latin nominative for "bridge" - and Saravi - the Latin genitive of "Saravus", the name given by the Romans to the river that nowadays flows across the commune.

At that time, the town was located on the via salinensis, an important Roman road linking Divodurum (Metz) to Argentorate (Strasbourg) via the Saverne pass and part of the great itinerary from Gesoriacum (Boulogne-sur-Mer) to Argentorate (Strasbourg) via Samarobriva (Amiens) and Durocortorum (Reims).

The ancient town of Pons Saravi developed around the Sarre, thanks to a wooden bridge. It was of an estimated width of eight meters and connected the current halls to the street of the Lieutenant-Bildstein. Its last version was dated from 247 AD.

=== Medieval period ===
At the beginning of the Middle Ages, Sarrebourg was a fortified town, located on the edge of the Lorraine and Rhine regions. It became the centre of a territory on the fringes of the influence zones of the neighbouring Lorraine and Alsatian powers. The existence of a saroensis pagus has been documented since the end of the 7th century; at that time the city had, among other things, a mint workshop. The Treaty of Meerssen, which concluded in 870 the division of Lotharingie between Charles the Bald and Louis the Germanic, refers to the county Sarachuua subterior, also known as Oberer Saargau. The latter stretched from the springs of the Saar to Sarreguemines and Sarrebourg was its capital, however it quickly disappeared.

From the 12th century to the 15th century, Sarrebourg is governed by the Bishopric of Metz, which makes a Christianization zone facing Alsace. However, at the end of the 12th and beginning of the 13th century, the Counts of Dabo and the Counts Palatine of Metz possessed Sarrebourg and the upper Saar valley. It was not until the death of Gertrude de Dabo and the extinction of the Dabo-Moha lineage that the bishops of Metz again exercised authority over the city. Between the 12th and 14th centuries, Sarrebourg underwent significant urban development. The city asserts itself as a commercial center and extends its influence on the surrounding countryside.

During this period, several religious buildings were created or developed. In 1173 the bishop of Metz established a hospice near the western gate of the city. In 1222 the management of this place and the leprosery of Hoff, was ensured by the Teutonic commandery. The latter had just settled near the market place, at the time. Bishop Jacques de Lorraine turned the church of Saint-Étienne into a collegiate church by installing a chapter of canons. In 1265-1266 Franciscan monks settled in Sarrebourg and built the chapel of the Cordeliers; between 1250 and 1276 the Dominican convent of Weyerstein was founded. On the military level, the bishop of Metz Jean d'Apremont undertook the consolidation of the city’s fortifications and the construction of new walls between 1230-1240 which would be completed by his successor Jacques de Lorraine.

=== Kauffmann Sarburg, the Burgundian wars and the integration into the Duchy of Lorraine ===
==== Kaufmannstadt Saarburg ====
The urban development of the twelfth and thirteenth centuries as well as the economic expansion of the city, with the strengthening of commercial links with Alsace, earned Sarrebourg the nickname of Kaufmannstadt-Saarburg. As Sarrebourg became a merchant city, the bourgeois emancipated themselves from the episcopal tutelage. In 1464 they met in the chapel of the Cordeliers and decided to pledge allegiance to the Duke of Lorraine in the context of the Burgundian Wars that were about to take place. However, the city did not join the bailiwick of Germany and remained autonomous within the duchy.

==== Burgundian Wars ====
In 1463, Ludwig von Lichtenberg and the authorities of Saarbrücken passed on military information to the magistrate of Strasbourg concerning war preparations made by the Duke of Burgundy and Ferry II, Lord of Blâmont and ally of the Burgundians.

In 1475, Charles the Bold conquered Lorraine and forced Duke René II to flee in Champagne. Of all the nobility of the duchy, only the counts of Bitche and the city of Sarrebourg refused to pay tribute to the invader. The latter was defended by a garrison of Strasburgers who wanted to protect the access to the Saverne pass, the main road to Alsace and the Rhine from the Lorraine plateau. In addition, the free city of Strasbourg was itself part of a military alliance against the Duke of Burgundy - the Lower Union also called the Alemannic League - formed in the spring of 1474 by the free imperial cities of Strasbourg, Basel, Colmar and Selestat, joined by the Confederation of the VIII swiss cantons and the Archduke of Austria, Sigismund of Habsburg.

At the same time, the Duke of Lorraine sought to join the forces of the Lower Union after his retreat at Joinville in Champagne. He asked King Louis XI of France for an escort to get to Switzerland through Lorraine in the absence of the Duke of Burgundy's troops. René II and the French hid their plan by pretending to take the duke back to Germany so that he could retire there after the loss of his duchy.

==== Annexations, revolutions and wars ====
The town suffered greatly from the Thirty Years' War, from 1618 to 1648, and its population declined considerably.

In 1661 with the Treaty of Vincennes, Louis XIV linked the city to the Kingdom of France.

Sarrebourg opened its railway station on 29 May 1851, thanks to the construction of the line between Strasbourg and Paris.

In accordance with the Treaty of Frankfurt of 1871, which ended the war against Prussia and its allies, the city of Sarrebourg was annexed, like the rest of Alsace-Lorraine, to the new German Empire.

Between 18 August and 20 August 1914 thousands of soldiers died around the city during the Battle of Sarrebourg, one of the first major battles of World War I. The Battle of Lorraine ended 25 August 1914.

== Cultural, historical and architectural heritage ==
It is possible to observe the old medieval ramparts of Sarrebourg. These remains are part of the city’s fortifications erected in the middle of the 13th century by Jean d'Apremont, bishop of Metz.

The Musée du pays de Sarrebourg (Museum of Sarrebourg and its surroundings) was created in 1905. Originally it was only an archaeological museum. It now includes a space dedicated to Marc Chagall and an exhibition of earthenware and porcelain from the Niderviller manufacture.

The sculptures trail, includes about twenty works scattered in the city center.

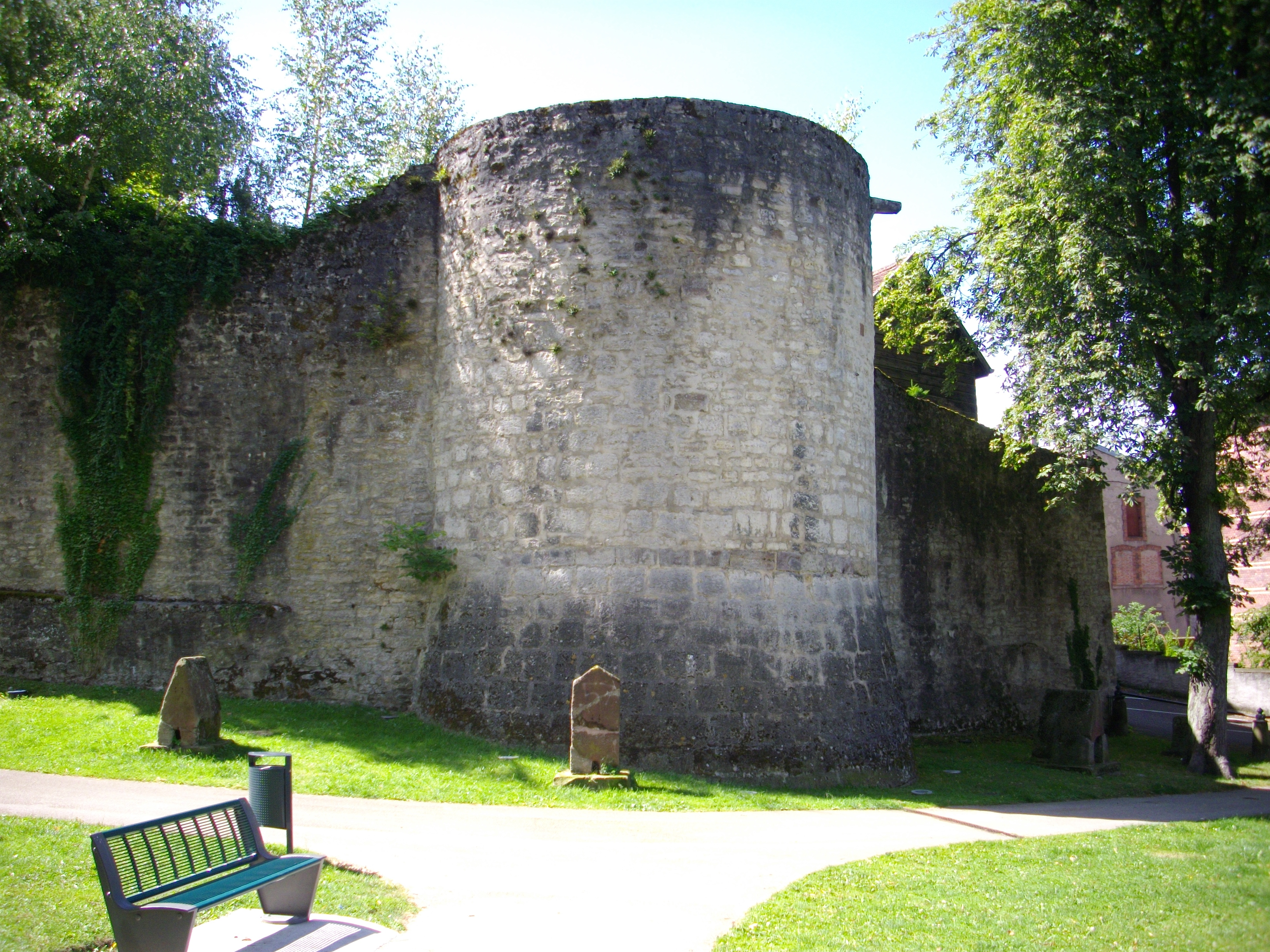
Remains of the ramparts

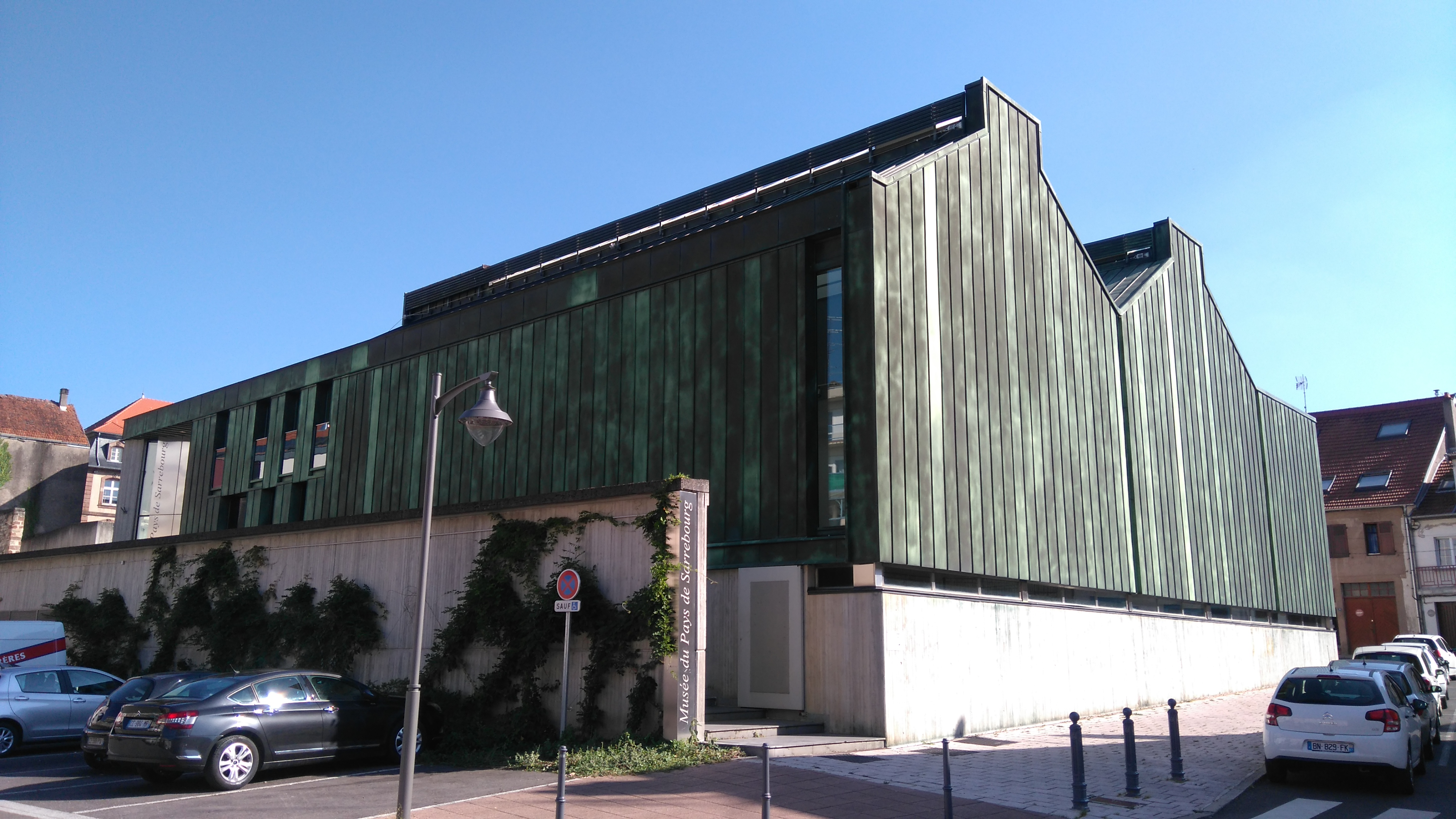
Musée du pays de Sarrebourg

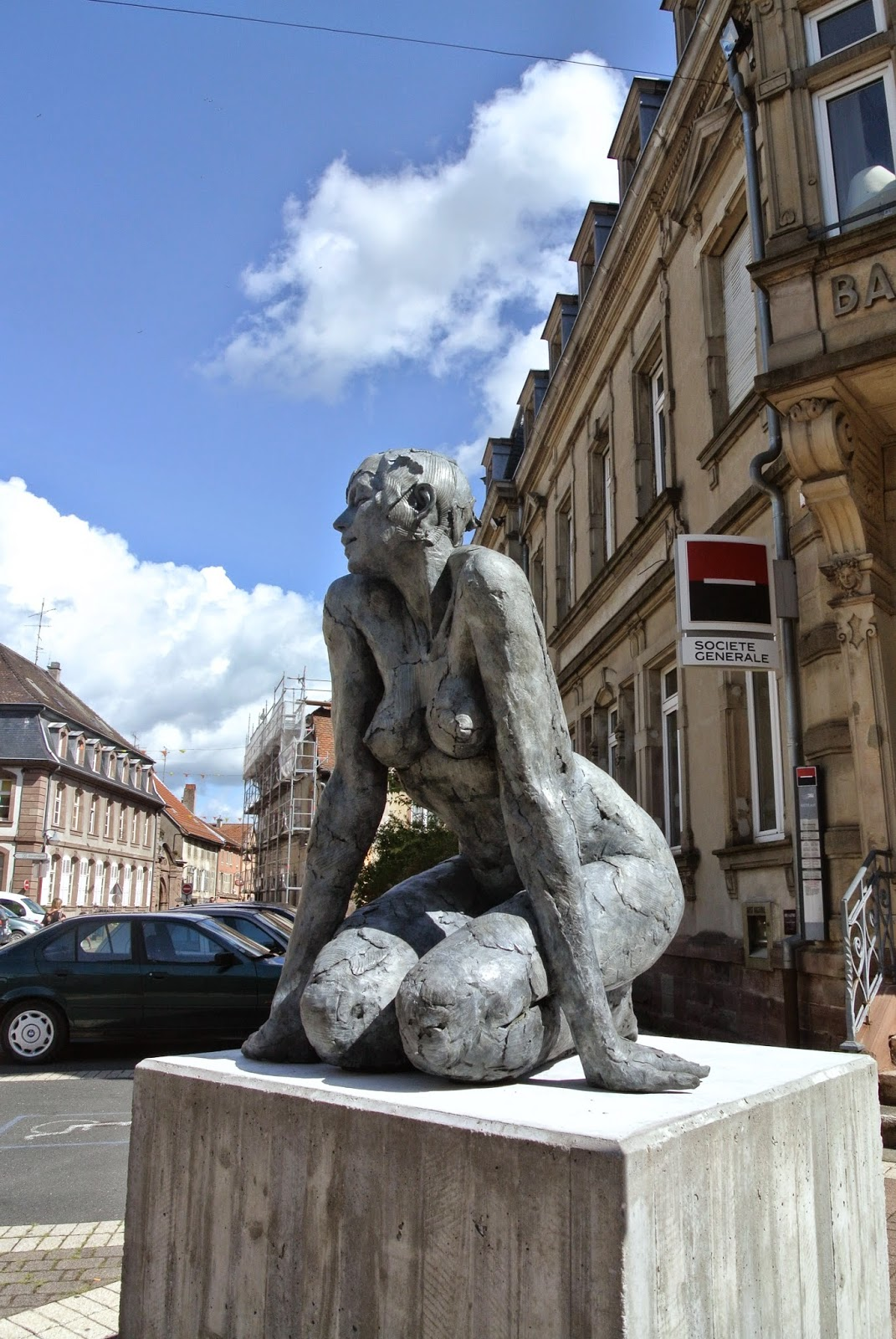
A part of the sculptures trail

=== National necropolises ===
Sarrebourg includes the national necroplis of Sarrebourg - Buhl and the national necropolis of prisoners of war (1914 - 1918).

=== Green spaces, parks and forests ===
A large leisure area has been built around Lévêque Pond, an old gravel pit in the southwest of the city. It includes a supervised swimming area, a playground, a mountain bike track, a minigolf, sports fields, an arboretum and a hamlet of cottages. The aquatic centre and tennis club are also located next to the leisure area.

To the north-west lies the state forest of Sarrebourg.

== Twin towns and sister cities ==
Sarrebourg is twinned with:

- Saarburg, Germany

== Notable people linked to Sarrebourg ==
- The French architect and pioneer of reinforced-concrete construction, Anatole de Baudot, was born in Sarrebourg in 1834.
- Charles Mangin, who was a French general during World War I, was born in Sarrebourg.
- Pierre Messmer, Prime Minister of France from 1972 to 1974, was also the mayor of Sarrebourg from 1971 to 1989.
- The French businessman Christian Streiff was also from Sarrebourg.
- Yohan Croizet, who was born in Sarrebourg in 1992, is an international professional football player.
- Kenny "kennyS" Schrub, professional Counter Strike: Global Offensive player, considered to be one of the best to ever touch the game

== Climate ==
Climate data for Sarrebourg (Nitting) (2007–2020 normals, extremes 2007–present)
Month	Jan	Feb	Mar	Apr	May	Jun	Jul	Aug	Sep	Oct	Nov	Dec	Year
Record high °C (°F)	17.4 (63.3)	21.1 (70.0)	25.8 (78.4)	29.4 (84.9)	32.9 (91.2)	36.5 (97.7)	37.9 (100.2)	37.8 (100.0)	33.0 (91.4)	28.9 (84.0)	21.8 (71.2)	17.7 (63.9)	37.9 (100.2)
Mean daily maximum °C (°F)	5.2 (41.4)	6.9 (44.4)	11.6 (52.9)	16.7 (62.1)	20.0 (68.0)	23.8 (74.8)	25.8 (78.4)	25.4 (77.7)	21.1 (70.0)	15.7 (60.3)	9.7 (49.5)	6.0 (42.8)	15.7 (60.3)
Daily mean °C (°F)	2.0 (35.6)	2.9 (37.2)	6.1 (43.0)	10.1 (50.2)	13.7 (56.7)	17.5 (63.5)	19.2 (66.6)	18.9 (66.0)	14.8 (58.6)	10.6 (51.1)	6.1 (43.0)	3.0 (37.4)	10.4 (50.7)
Mean daily minimum °C (°F)	−1.1 (30.0)	−1.0 (30.2)	0.6 (33.1)	3.6 (38.5)	7.4 (45.3)	11.1 (52.0)	12.6 (54.7)	12.3 (54.1)	8.5 (47.3)	5.5 (41.9)	2.4 (36.3)	0.0 (32.0)	5.2 (41.4)
Record low °C (°F)	−15.3 (4.5)	−17.4 (0.7)	−11.2 (11.8)	−6.2 (20.8)	−1.8 (28.8)	2.3 (36.1)	4.0 (39.2)	4.3 (39.7)	−0.5 (31.1)	−7.7 (18.1)	−12.1 (10.2)	−19.4 (−2.9)	−19.4 (−2.9)
Average precipitation mm (inches)	85.7 (3.37)	78.5 (3.09)	74.2 (2.92)	60.1 (2.37)	89.0 (3.50)	80.3 (3.16)	80.0 (3.15)	76.5 (3.01)	84.7 (3.33)	88.4 (3.48)	91.5 (3.60)	104.8 (4.13)	993.7 (39.12)
Average precipitation days (≥ 1.0 mm)	13.3	11.8	11.2	10.0	12.0	10.8	10.6	10.2	10.3	12.1	13.0	14.8	140.0
Source: Meteociel

== See also ==
- List of free imperial cities
