= Battle of Lorraine =

1914 Western Front battle of World War I

- Part of the Battle of the Frontiers on the Western Front of the First World War
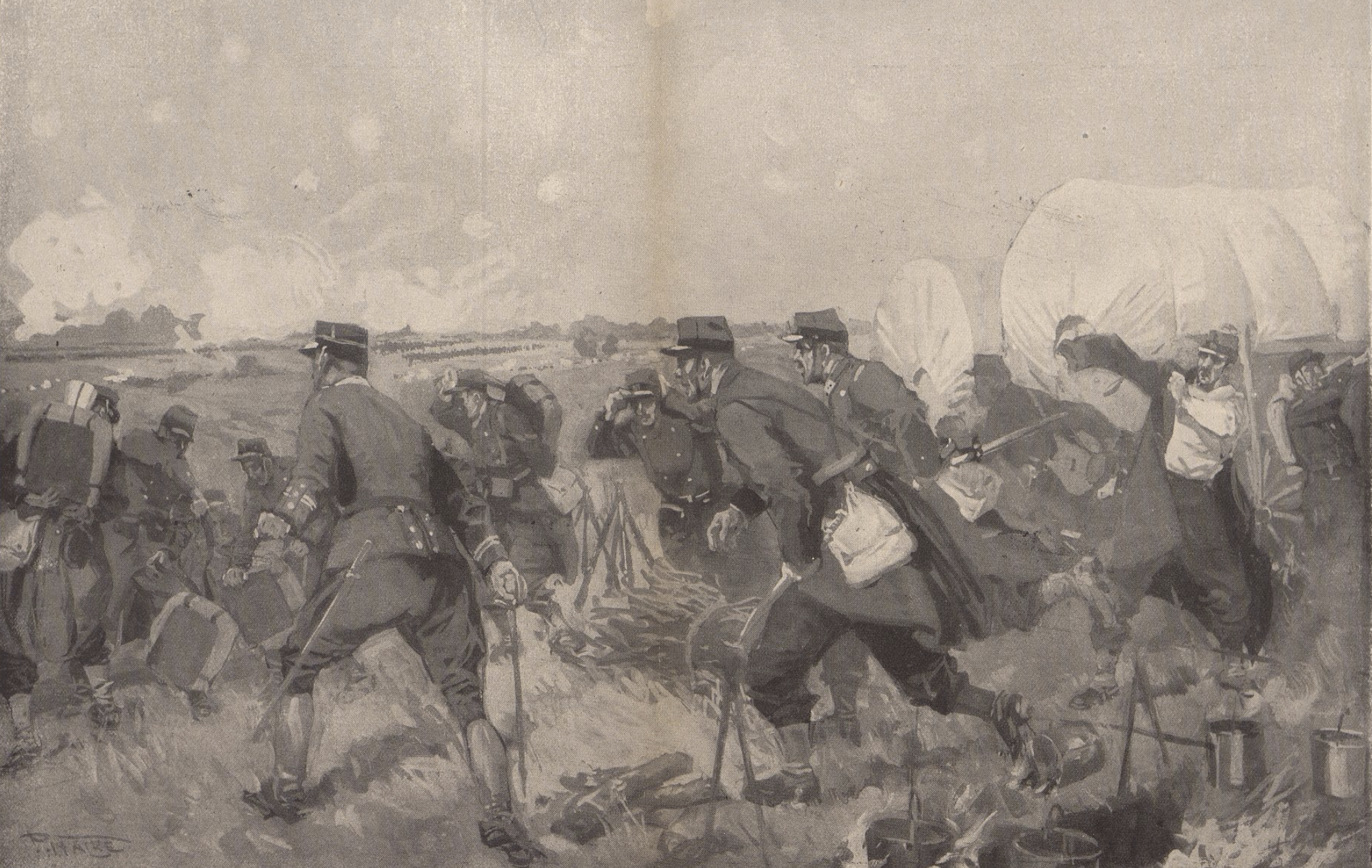
- French infantry surprised by the Germans while cooking at Saarburg (20-21 August 1914, illustration by P. Halke)
Date	14–25 August 1914
Location	Lorraine 48°48′N 06°43′E
Result	German victory

Belligerents
Germany	France

Commanders and leaders
(German Empire) Konrad Krafft von Dellmensingen (German Empire) Rupprecht of Bavaria (German Empire) Josias von Heeringen	(French Third Republic) Auguste Dubail (French Third Republic) Noël de Castelnau (French Third Republic) Ferdinand Foch

Strength
6th Army	Second Army

Casualties and losses
66,500	Unknown
- Lorraine, in the modern French region of Grand Est. From 1871 to 1919, German Lorraine was part of the German empire.

The Battle of Lorraine (14 August – 7 September 1914) was a battle on the Western Front during the First World War. The armies of France and Germany had completed their mobilisation, the French with Plan XVII, to conduct an offensive through Lorraine and Alsace into Germany and the Germans with Aufmarsch II West, for an offensive in the north through Luxembourg and Belgium into France, supplemented with attacks in the south to prevent the French from transferring troops to the greater threat in the north.

== Background ==
=== Belgium ===
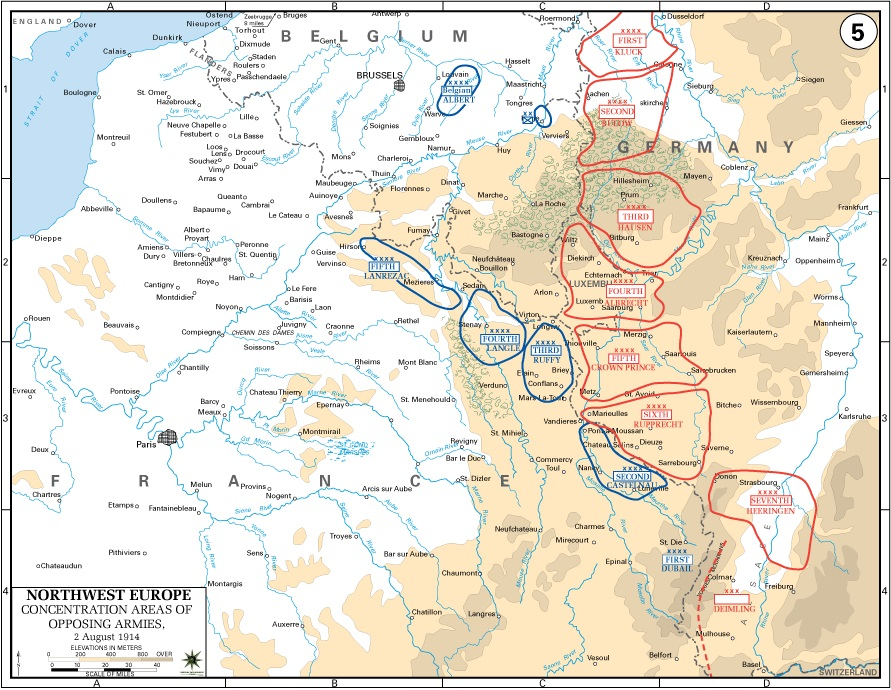
Western Front, 2 August 1914

Belgian military planning was based on the assumption that other powers would uphold Belgian neutrality by expelling an invader. The likelihood of a German invasion did not lead the Belgian government to see France and Britain as potential allies nor did it intend to do more than protect its independence. The Anglo-French Entente (1904) had led the Belgians to perceive that the British attitude to Belgium had changed and that they would fight to protect Belgian independence. A General Staff was formed in 1910 but the Chef d'État-Major Général de l'Armée, Lieutenant-Général Harry Jungbluth was retired on 30 June 1912 and not replaced by Lieutenant-General Chevalier de Selliers de Moranville until May 1914.

Moranville began planning for the concentration of the army and met railway officials on 29 July. Belgian troops were to be massed in central Belgium, in front of the National redoubt of Belgium ready to face any border, while the Fortified Position of Liège and Fortified Position of Namur were left to secure the frontiers. On mobilisation, the King became Commander-in-Chief and chose where the army was to concentrate. Amid the disruption of the new rearmament plan, the disorganised and poorly trained Belgian soldiers would benefit from a central position to delay contact with an invader but it would also need fortifications for defence, which were on the frontier. A school of thought wanted a return to a frontier deployment, in line with French theories of the offensive. Belgian plans became a compromise in which the field army concentrated behind the Gete river, with two divisions forward at Liège and Namur.

=== Aufmarsch II West ===
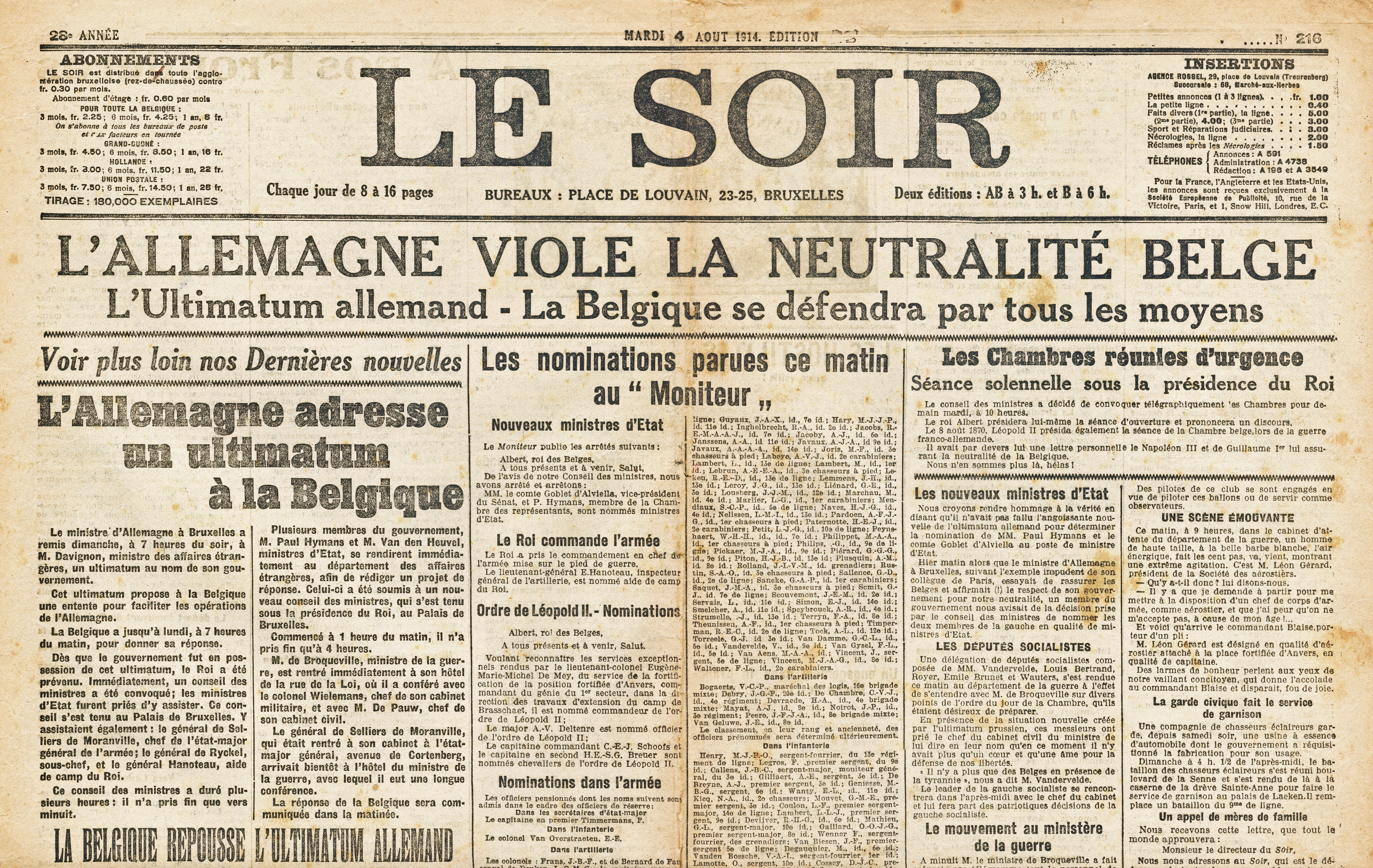
Headline in Le Soir, 4 August 1914

German strategy had given priority to offensive operations against France and a defensive posture against Russia since 1891. German planning was determined by numerical inferiority, the speed of mobilisation and concentration and the effect of the vast increase of the power of modern weapons. Frontal attacks were expected to be costly and protracted, leading to limited success, particularly after the French and Russians modernised their fortifications on the frontiers with Germany. Alfred von Schlieffen Chief of the Imperial German General Staff (Oberste Heeresleitung, OHL) from 1891–1906, devised a plan to evade the French frontier fortifications with an offensive on the northern flank with a local numerical superiority. By 1898–1899, such a manoeuvre was intended to rapidly pass through Belgium, between Antwerp and Namur and threaten Paris from the north.

Helmuth von Moltke the Younger succeeded Schlieffen in 1906 and was less certain that the French would conform to German assumptions. Moltke adapted the deployment and concentration plan, to accommodate an attack in the centre or an enveloping attack from both flanks as variants to the plan, by adding divisions to the left flank opposite the French frontier, from the c. 1,700,000 men expected to be mobilised in the Westheer (Western Army). The main German force would still advance through Belgium and attack southwards into France, the French armies would be enveloped on the left and pressed back over the Meuse, Aisne, Somme, Oise, Marne and Seine, unable to withdraw into central France. The French would either be annihilated or the manoeuvre from the north would create conditions for victory in the centre or in Lorraine on the common border.

=== Plan XVII ===
Under Plan XVII, the French peacetime army was to form five field armies of c. 2,000,000 men, with groups of Reserve divisions attached to each army and a group of reserve divisions on the flanks. The armies were to concentrate opposite the German frontier around Épinal, Nancy and Verdun–Mezières, with an army in reserve around Ste. Ménéhould and Commercy. Since 1871, railway building had given the French General staff sixteen lines to the German frontier against thirteen available to the German army and the French could wait until German intentions were clear. The French deployment was intended to be ready for a German offensive in Lorraine or through Belgium. It was anticipated that the Germans would use reserve troops but also expected that a large German army would be mobilised on the border with Russia, leaving the western army with sufficient troops only to advance through Belgium, south of the Meuse and the Sambre rivers. French intelligence had obtained a 1905 map exercise of the German general staff, in which German troops had gone no further north than Namur and assumed that plans to besiege Belgian forts were a defensive measure against the Belgian army.

A German attack from south-eastern Belgium towards Mézières and a possible offensive from Lorraine towards Verdun, Nancy and St. Dié was anticipated; the plan was a development of Plan XVI and made more provision for the possibility of a German offensive through Belgium. The First, Second and Third armies were to concentrate between Épinal and Verdun opposite Alsace and Lorraine, the Fifth Army was to assemble from Montmédy to Sedan and Mézières and the Fourth Army was to be held back west of Verdun, ready to move east to attack the southern flank of a German invasion through Belgium or south against the northern flank of an attack through Lorraine. No formal provision was made for combined operations with the British Expeditionary Force (BEF) but joint arrangements had been made and during the Second Moroccan Crisis in 1911, the French had been told that six divisions could be expected to operate around Maubeuge.

=== Declarations of war ===
At midnight on 31 July – 1 August, the German government sent an ultimatum to Russia and announced a state of "Kriegsgefahr" during the day; the Ottoman government then ordered mobilisation, and the London Stock Exchange closed. On 1 August, the British government ordered the mobilisation of the navy, and the German government ordered general mobilisation and declared war on Russia. Hostilities commenced on the Polish frontier, the French government ordered general mobilisation, and next day the German government sent an ultimatum to Belgium, demanding passage through Belgian territory and German troops crossed the frontier of Luxembourg. Military operations began on the French frontier, Libau was bombarded by the German light cruiser SMS Augsburg and the British government guaranteed naval protection for French coasts. On 3 August, the Belgian Government refused German demands and the British Government guaranteed military support to Belgium, should Germany invade. Germany declared war on France, the British government ordered general mobilisation and Italy declared neutrality. On 4 August, the British government sent an ultimatum to Germany which expired at midnight on 4–5 August, Central European Time. Belgium severed diplomatic relations with Germany and Germany declared war on Belgium. German troops crossed the Belgian frontier and attacked Liège.

== Prelude ==
=== German offensive preparations ===
The 6th Army deployed in the XXI and XVI corps areas from the Vosges north to Metz, the III Corps arriving from 8–12 August and moving to the border from Beux to Béchy and Rémilly, the II Bavarian Corps deployed from 7–10 August from Lucy to Château Salins and Moerchingen and the XXI Corps mobilised around Dieuze on 10 August and moved a brigade of the 42nd Division to Igney, as a flank guard for the I Bavarian Corps. On 11 August a French night attack was repulsed but events in the Vosges led to the I Bavarian Corps moving quickly to Eyweiler and Sieweiler.

== Battle ==
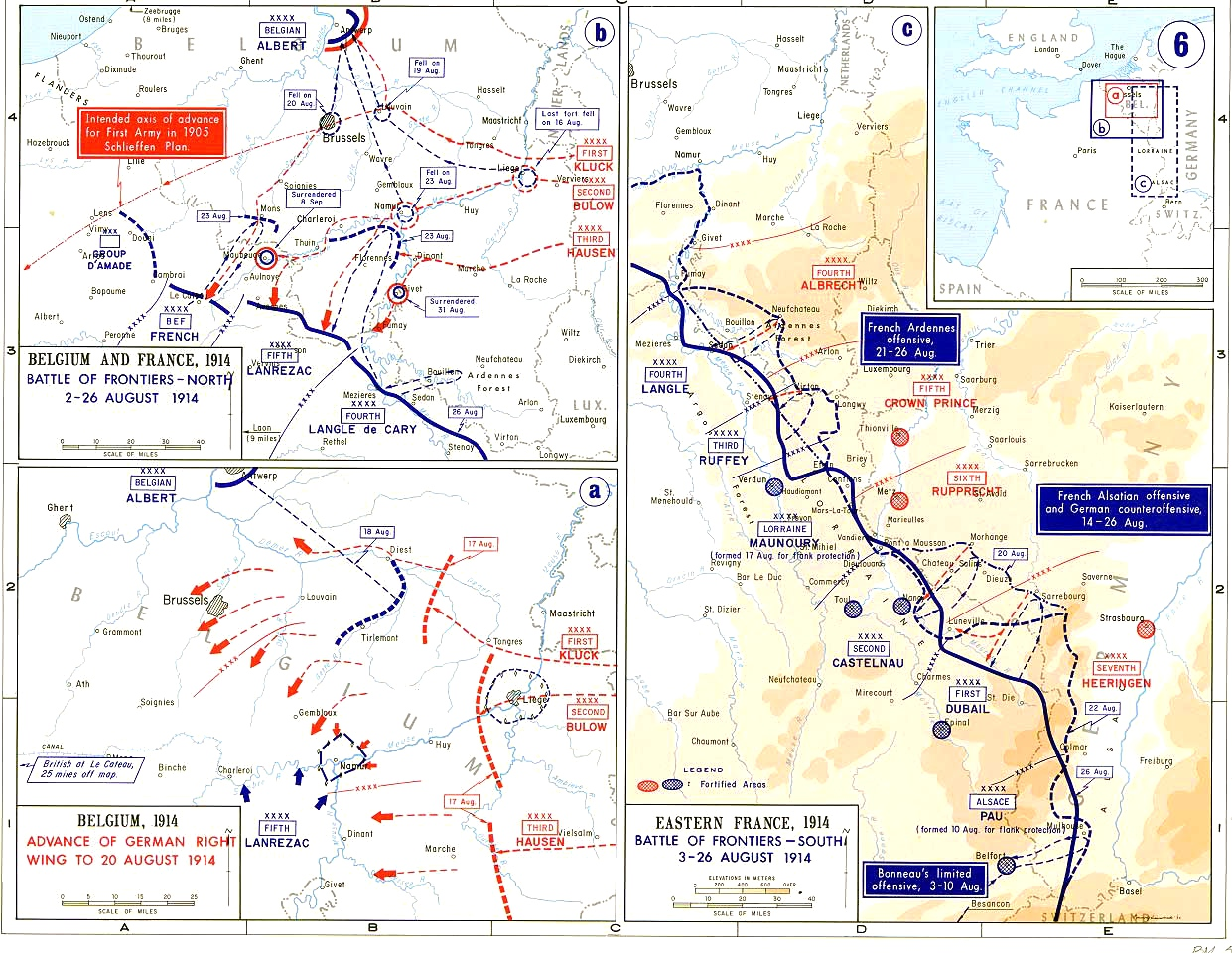
Battle of the Frontiers

The main French offensive in the south began on 14 August, when the First Army (General Auguste Dubail) advanced with two corps into the Vosges and two corps north-east towards Sarrebourg, as the two right-flank corps of the Second Army (General de Castelnau) advanced on the left of the First Army. One corps and the Second Group of Reserve Divisions advanced slowly towards Morhange in echelon, as a flank guard against a German attack from Metz. The First Army had captured several passes further south since 8 August, to protect the southern flank as the army advanced to Donon and Sarrebourg.

Despite warnings from Joffre against divergence, the army was required to advance towards the Vosges passes to the south-east, eastwards towards Donon and north-east towards Sarrebourg. German troops withdrew during the day, Donon was captured and on the left flank, an advance of 10–12 km (6.2–7.5 mi) was made. At dusk the 26th Division of the XIII Corps attacked Cirey and was engaged by artillery and machine-guns, which repulsed the French with many casualties. On 15 August, the Second Army reported that German long-range artillery had been able to bombard the French artillery and infantry undisturbed and that dug-in German infantry had inflicted many casualties on the French as they attacked.

The Second Army had to attack methodically after artillery preparation but managed to push back the Germans. Intelligence reports identified a main line of resistance of the German 6th Army and 7th Army (combined under Crown Prince Rupprecht of Bavaria) close to the advanced French troops and that a counter-offensive was imminent. On 16 August, the Germans opposed the advance with long-range artillery-fire and on 17 August, the First Army reinforced the advance on the city in the Battle of Sarrebourg. When the Germans were found to have left the city, Joffre ordered the Second Army to incline further to the north, which had the effect of increasing the divergence of the French armies.

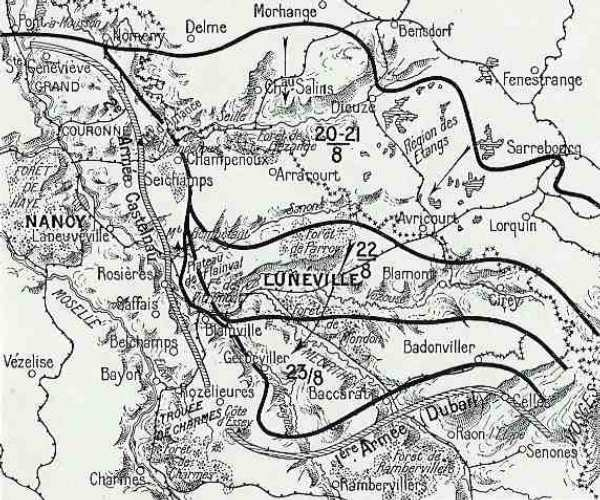
French withdrawal, 20–23 August 1914

A German counter-attack on 20 August, forced separate battles on the French armies, which were defeated and retreated in disorder. The German pursuit was slow and Castelnau was able to occupy positions east of Nancy and extend the right wing towards the south, to regain touch with the First Army. During 22 August, the right flank was attacked and driven back 25 km (16 mi) from the position that the offensive had begun on 14 August. The First Army withdrew but managed to maintain contact with the Second Army. Between 24 and 26 August, both French armies repelled the German offensive at the Battle of the Trouée de Charmes and regained the line of 14 August by early September.

=== Casualties ===
In 2009, Holger Herwig used records from the Sanitätsberichte to give 34,598 casualties in the 6th Army during August, with 11,476 dead. In the 7th Army there were 32,054 casualties in August, with 10,328 men killed.
