= Morhange =

- Commune
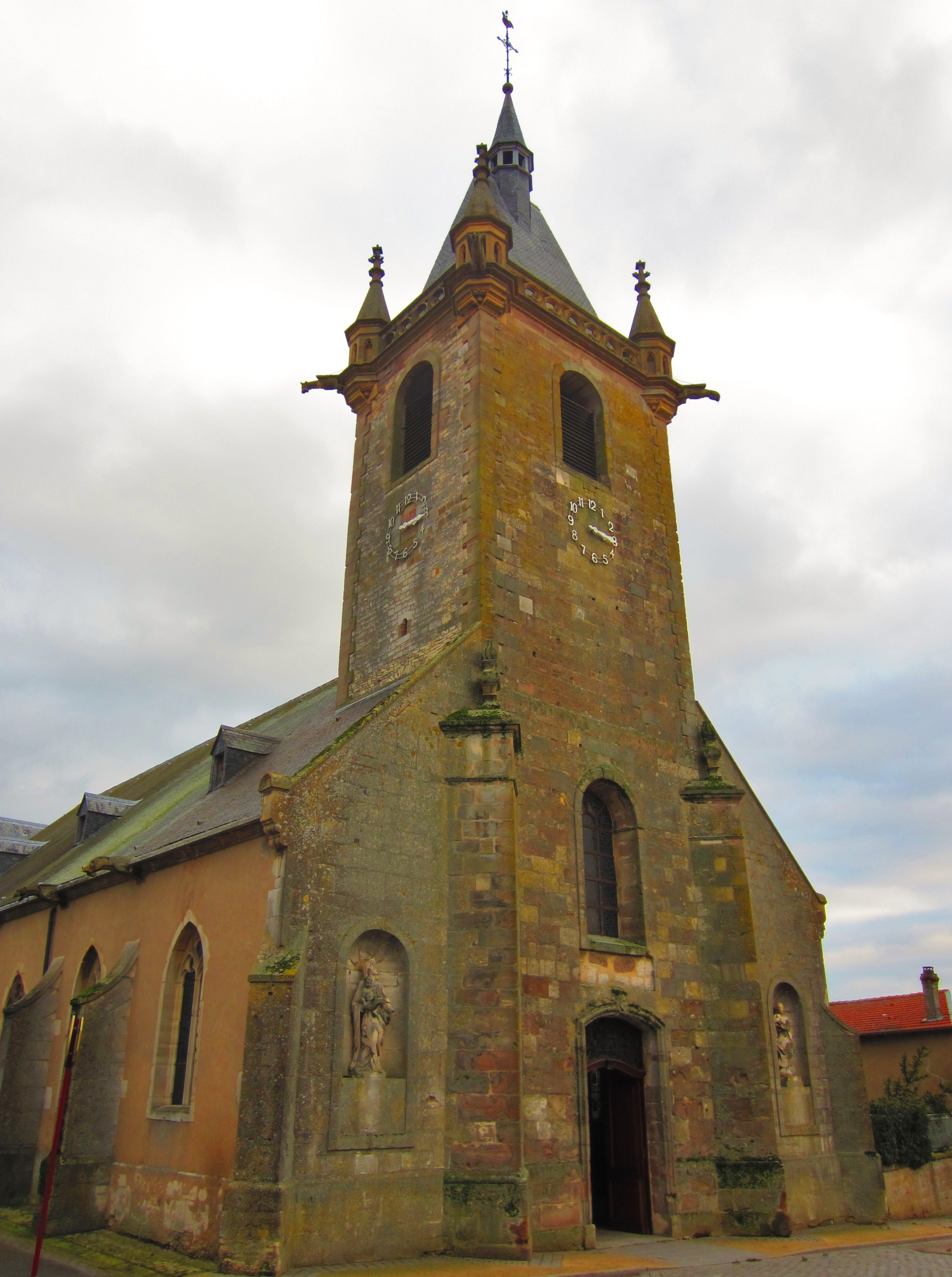
- The church in Morhange

- Coat of arms
- Location of Morhange
- Location within France Location within Grand Est
- Coordinates: 48°55′28″N 6°38′11″E
- Country: France
- Region: Grand Est
- Department: Moselle
- Arrondissement: Forbach-Boulay-Moselle
- Canton: Sarralbe
- Intercommunality: CA Saint-Avold Synergie

Government
  - Mayor (2020–2026): Christian Stinco
- Area^{1}: 15.38 km^{2} (5.94 sq mi)
- Elevation: 255 m (837 ft)
- Highest elevation: 305 m (1,001 ft)
- Lowest elevation: 221 m (725 ft)
- Population (2023): 3,308
  - Density: 215.1/km^{2} (557.1/sq mi)
- Time zone: UTC+01:00 (CET)
  - Summer (DST): UTC+02:00 (CEST)
- INSEE/Postal code: 57483 /57340
- ^{1} French Land Register data, which excludes lakes, ponds, glaciers > 1 km^{2} (0.386 sq mi or 247 acres) and river estuaries.

Morhange (French pronunciation: [mɔʁɑ̃ʒ]; German: Mörchingen; Lorraine Franconian Märchinge) is a commune in the Moselle department in Grand Est in north-eastern France.

== History ==
The Battle of Morhange was one of the first battles of World War I.

== Population ==
Historical population
Year	Pop.	±% p.a.
1968	4,478	—
1975	4,724	+0.77%
1982	4,674	−0.15%
1990	4,460	−0.58%
1999	4,050	−1.07%
2007	3,867	−0.58%
2012	3,578	−1.54%
2017	3,445	−0.75%
2023	3,308	−0.67%
Source: INSEE

== See also ==
- Communes of the Moselle department
