= Battle of the Frontiers =

Series of battles; part of the Western Front of World War I

- Part of the Western Front of the First World War
- Map of operations on the frontiers
Date	7 August – 6 September 1914
Location	Lorraine, French and Belgian Ardennes 49°00′N 06°00′E
Result	German victory

Belligerents
France; Belgium; United Kingdom	Germany

Commanders and leaders
(French Third Republic) Joseph Joffre; (Belgium) King Albert I; (United Kingdom of Great Britain and Ireland) Sir John French	(German Empire) Helmuth von Moltke

Strength
(French Third Republic) 62 divisions; (Belgium) 6 divisions; (United Kingdom of Great Britain and Ireland) 6 divisions	(German Empire) 68 divisions

Casualties and losses
- 329,000 (6 August – 5 September); (United Kingdom of Great Britain and Ireland) 29,598 (6 August – 30 September); (Note: Total killed, wounded, missing or died of wounds from the British Expeditionary Force in the months of August and September.)

The Battle of the Frontiers (French: Bataille des Frontières; German: Grenzschlachten; Dutch: Slag der Grenzen) comprised battles fought along the eastern frontier of France and in southern Belgium, shortly after the outbreak of the First World War. The battles resolved the military strategies of the French Chief of Staff General Joseph Joffre with Plan XVII and an offensive adaptation of the German Aufmarsch II deployment plan by Helmuth von Moltke the Younger. The German concentration on the right (northern) flank, was to wheel through Belgium and attack the French in the rear.

The German advance was delayed by the movement of the French Fifth Army under General Charles Lanrezac towards the north-west to intercept them and the presence of the British Expeditionary Force (BEF) on the French left. The Franco-British troops were driven back by the Germans, who were able to invade into northern France. French and British rearguard actions delayed the Germans, allowing the French time to transfer forces on the eastern frontier to the west to defend Paris, culminating in the First Battle of the Marne.

== Background ==
=== Belgian plans ===
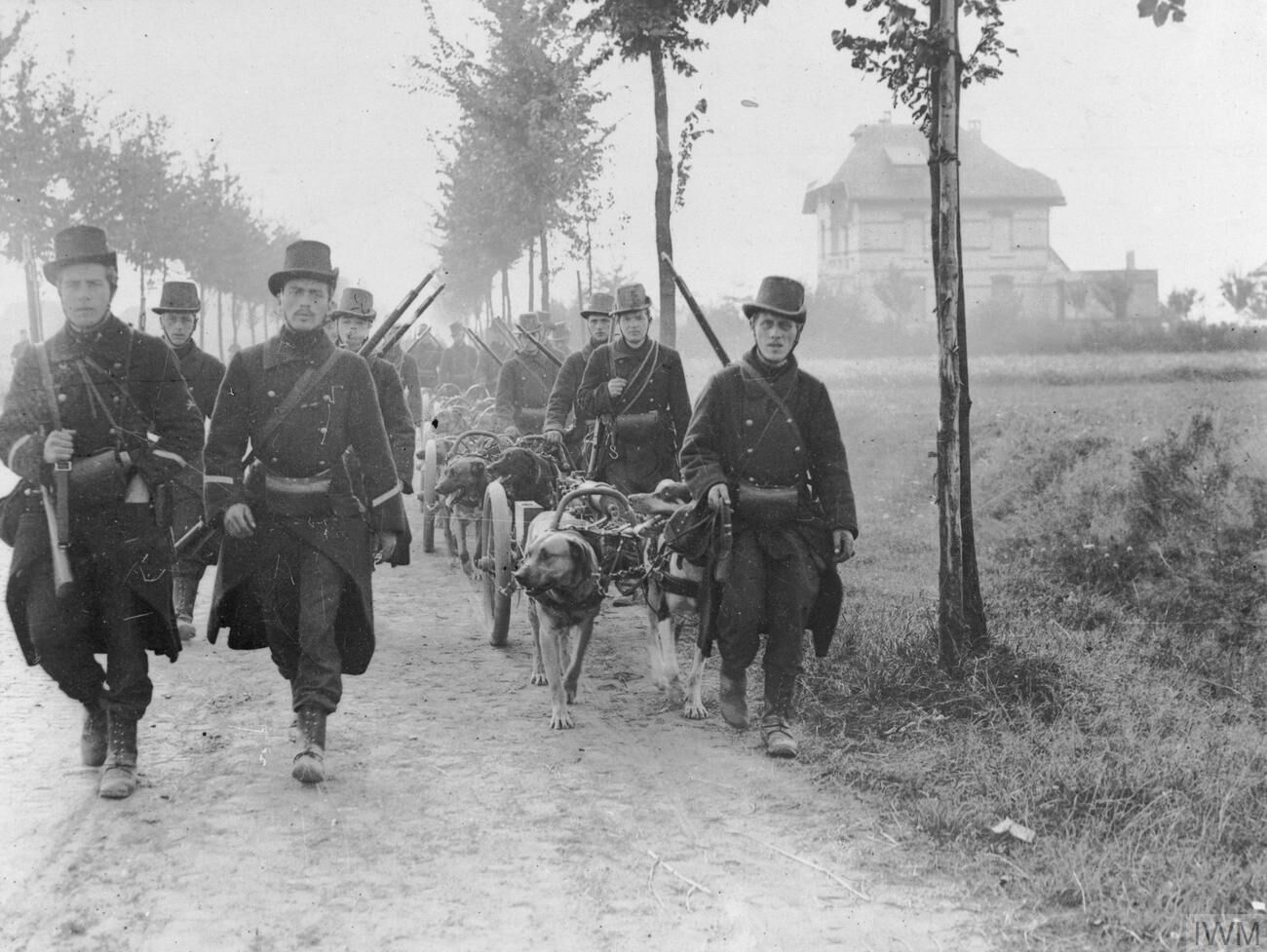
Belgian troops, with machine-guns pulled by dogs, photographed during the Battle of the Frontiers

Belgian military planning assumed that other powers would fulfil their obligations under the Treaty of London (1839), to assist the Belgian Army to eject an invader. The British and French had not formed a formal alliance despite the Anglo-French Entente (1904). The Belgians judged that the British attitude towards their country had changed and that Belgium had come to be seen as a British protectorate. A Belgian General Staff was formed in 1910 but the Chef d'État-Major Général de l'Armée, Lieutenant-Général Harry Jungbluth was retired on 30 June 1912 and not replaced by Lieutenant-General Chevalier de Selliers de Moranville until May 1914. Moranville began planning for the concentration of the army and met Belgian railway officials on 29 July.

The Belgian army was to be massed in central Belgium, in front of the National redoubt of Belgium, ready to face any border, while the Fortified Position of Liège and Fortified Position of Namur were left to secure the frontiers. On mobilisation, the King became Commander-in-Chief and chose where the army was to concentrate. Amid the disruption of the new rearmament plan, disorganised and poorly trained Belgian soldiers would benefit from a central position to delay contact with an invader but it would also need fortifications for defence, which were on the frontier. A school of thought wanted a return to a frontier deployment, in line with French theories of the offensive. Belgian plans became a compromise, in which the field army concentrated behind the Gete river, with two divisions further forward at Liège and Namur.

=== Schlieffen–Moltke Plan ===
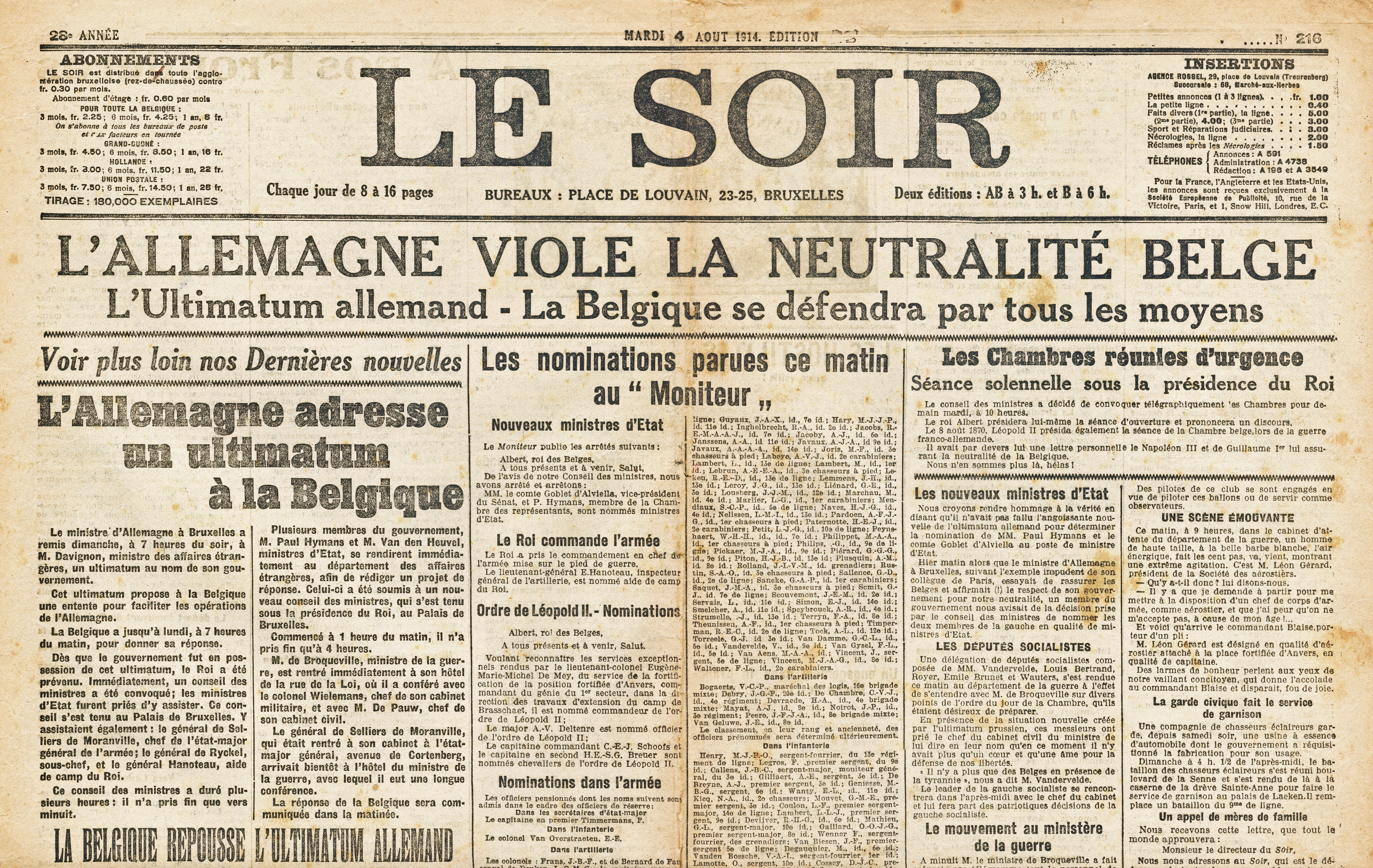
Headline in Le Soir, 4 August 1914

Alfred von Schlieffen, Chief of the Imperial German General Staff (Oberste Heeresleitung, OHL) from 1891–1906, devised plans for a decisive battle against the French army in Germany, Belgium or France. Aufmarsch I West was a contingency plan for a Franco-German war, in which France (due to fewer numbers) would be on the defensive and Germany would attack by invading Belgium between Antwerp and Namur to advance south and breach the Verdun–Marne–Paris defensive area. The German armies would then pause until railways could be repaired and supplies accumulated for a second offensive operation. Helmuth von Moltke the Younger succeeded Schlieffen in 1906 and became convinced that an isolated Franco-German war was impossible and that Italian and Austro-Hungarian forces would not be available to defend the Franco-German border as had been planned. Aufmarsch I was abolished but in 1914 Moltke tried to apply the offensive strategy of Aufmarsch I to the deployment plan Aufmarsch II for a two-front war. In 2014, Terry Holmes wrote,

From his assessment of French defensive capability Schlieffen concluded that the German army would need at least 48.5 corps to succeed with an attack on France by way of Belgium, but Moltke planned to attack through Belgium with just 34 corps at his disposal in the west. The Schlieffen plan [sic] amounts to a critique of German strategy in 1914 since it clearly predicted the failure of Moltke’s underpowered invasion of France. [...] Moltke followed the trajectory of the Schlieffen plan, but only up to the point where it was painfully obvious that he would have needed the army of the Schlieffen plan to proceed any further along these lines.

The main German force tried to follow Aufmarsch I to envelop the French armies on the left (north) and press them back over the Meuse, Aisne, Somme, Oise, Marne and Seine rivers, unable to withdraw into central France. Moltke hoped that the French would either be annihilated or the manoeuvre from the north would create conditions for victory in the centre or in Lorraine, on the common border.

=== Plan XVII ===
Under Plan XVII, the French peacetime army was to form five field armies of c. 2,000,000 men, with groups of Reserve divisions attached to each army and with a group of reserve divisions on the southern and northern flanks. The armies were to concentrate opposite the German frontier around Épinal, Nancy and Verdun–Mezières, with an army in reserve around Ste Menehould and Commercy. Since 1871, railway building had given the French General Staff sixteen lines to the German frontier against thirteen available to the German army; the French could wait until German intentions were clear. The French deployment was intended to be ready for a German offensive in Lorraine or through Belgium. It was anticipated that the Germans would use reserve troops but also that a large German army would be mobilised on the border with Russia, leaving the western army with sufficient troops only to advance through Belgium south of the Meuse and the Sambre rivers. French intelligence had obtained a map exercise of the German general staff of 1905, in which German troops had gone no further north than Namur and assumed that plans to besiege Belgian forts were a defensive measure against the Belgian army.

A German attack from south-eastern Belgium towards Mézières and a possible offensive from Lorraine towards Verdun, Nancy and St Dié was anticipated. The plan was an evolution of Plan XVI and made more provision for the possibility of a German offensive through Belgium. The First, Second and Third armies were to concentrate between Épinal and Verdun opposite Alsace and Lorraine, the Fifth Army was to assemble from Montmédy to Sedan and Mézières. The Fourth Army was to be held back, west of Verdun, ready to move east to attack the southern flank of a German invasion through Belgium or southwards against the northern flank of an attack through Lorraine. No formal provision was made for combined operations with the British Expeditionary Force (BEF) but joint arrangements had been made and in 1911, during the Second Moroccan Crisis, the French had been told that six divisions could be expected to operate around Maubeuge.

=== Declarations of war ===
At midnight on 31 July/1 August, the German government sent an ultimatum to Russia and announced a state of Kriegsgefahr during the day; the Ottoman government ordered mobilisation and the London Stock Exchange closed. On 1 August, the British government ordered the mobilisation of the navy, the German government ordered general mobilisation and declared war on Russia. Hostilities commenced on the frontier of Congress Poland; the French government ordered mobilisation and next day the German government sent an ultimatum to Belgium demanding free passage, as German troops were crossing the frontier of Luxembourg. Military operations began on the French frontier, Libau was bombarded by a German light cruiser SMS Augsburg and the British government guaranteed naval protection for French coasts. On 3 August, the Belgian Government refused German demands and the British Government promised military support to Belgium should Germany invade. Germany declared war on France, the British government ordered general mobilisation and Italy declared neutrality. On 4 August, the British government sent an ultimatum to Germany and declared war at midnight on 4/5 August, Central European Time. Belgium severed diplomatic relations with Germany and Germany declared war on Belgium. German troops crossed the Belgian frontier and attacked Liège.

== Prelude ==
=== French preparations ===
Joseph Joffre, who had been Commander-in-Chief of the French army since 1911 and the Minister of War, Adolphe Messimy met on 1 August, to agree that the military conduct of the war should exclusively be the responsibility of the Commander-in-Chief. On 2 August, as small parties of German soldiers crossed the French border, Messimy told Joffre that he had the freedom to order French troops across the German but not the Belgian frontier. Joffre sent warning orders to the covering forces near the frontier, requiring the VII Corps to prepare to advance towards Mühlhausen (Mulhouse) to the north-east of Belfort and XX Corps to make ready to begin an offensive towards Nancy. As soon as news arrived that German troops had entered Luxembourg, the Fourth Army was ordered to move between the Third and Fifth armies, ready to attack to the north of Verdun. Operations into Belgium were forbidden, to deny the Germans a pretext until 4 August, when it was certain that German troops had already violated the Belgian border. To comply with the Franco-Russian Alliance, Joffre ordered an invasion of Alsace-Lorraine for 14 August, although anticipating a German offensive through Belgium.

On 8 August, General Instruction No. 1 had ordered the Fifth Army to take a position on the left of the Fourth Army, ready to attack the southern flank of German force advancing from Mézières and Mouzon, through the difficult terrain in between. All four corps covered this front until 12 August, when Joffre allowed General Charles Lanrezac to move I Corps north to Givet to oppose a potential German attempt to cross the Meuse between Givet and Namur 35 km (22 mi) further north, which extended the army front to 80 km (50 mi). As Lanrezac became aware of the size of the German force in Belgium and wanted to reinforce the left flank by moving to Namur, Joffre refused to allow the army front to be extended to 110 km (68 mi) and ordered Lanrezac to keep the army in a central position near Mézières, ready to oppose a German offensive from Mouzon to Namur. On 14 August Joffre and Lanrezac met but Joffre considered that only a few German cavalry and infantry parties had crossed the Meuse. With the BEF moving to Maubeuge and Hirson a redeployment of the Fifth Army would disrupt the deployment of the other armies. On 14 August a new intelligence report showed eight German corps between Luxembourg and Liège and by the next day Joffre allowed the move of the Fifth Army north, to operate beyond the Meuse. The XI Corps was transferred to the Fourth Army and the XVIII Corps was moved from the Third Army to the Fifth Army, which was made responsible for the defence of Maubeuge.

Joffre began to dismiss commanders in early August, beginning with the VII Corps commander, Major-General Louis Bonneau; by 6 September he had removed two army, ten corps and 38 divisional commanders, by transferring them to Limoges (Limogé). The VII Corps in the south was reinforced by two divisions, a cavalry division and the First Group of Reserve Divisions. The corps was renamed the Army of Alsace, to relieve the First Army of concern about Alsace during the operations in Lorraine. Two corps were removed from the Second Army and became a strategic reserve. Joffre met Sir John French on 16 August and learned that the British could be ready by 24 August, Joffre also arranged for Territorial divisions to cover the area from Maubeuge to Dunkirk. The German siege of the Liège forts ended on 16 August and the 1st and 2nd armies with twelve corps and the 3rd Army with four corps began to advance behind cavalry screens. On 18 August, Joffre ordered the Fifth Army to prepare for a German offensive on both banks of the Meuse or to meet a small force on the north bank. The Fifth Army began to move towards Namur, in the angle of the Meuse and Sambre rivers on 19 August, which required a march of 100 km (62 mi) by some units.

=== French plan ===
On 5 August, Joffre ordered an offensive by the VII Corps, on the right flank of the First Army, to begin on 7 August towards Mulhouse. The capture of the 2nd Army order of battle on 7 August, convinced Joffre that the strength of the German forces on the flanks had left the centre weak and vulnerable to an offensive towards Neufchâteau and Arlon. On 8 August, Joffre issued General Instruction No. 1, containing his strategic intent, which was to destroy the German army rather than capture ground. The offensive into Alsace and that by the First and Second armies into Lorraine, would pin down German forces and attract reinforcements, as the main offensive further north drove in the German centre and outflanked the German forces in Belgium from the south. Joffre expected that the attack into the German centre would meet little resistance. The First and Second armies would advance south of the German fortified area from Metz–Thionville, with the Fourth Reserve Group guarding the northern flank near Hirson, to watch the Chimay Gap and deflect a German attack from the north or east. The strategy assumed that the main German force would be deployed around Luxembourg and from Metz–Thionville, with smaller forces in Belgium. On 9 August, an intelligence report had one German active corps near Freiburg close to the Swiss border, three near Strasbourg, four in Luxembourg to the north of Thionville and six from Liège in Belgium, towards the north end of Luxembourg, which left five corps un-located. The French general staff inferred that they were between Metz-Thionville and Luxembourg, ready to advance towards Sedan or Mézières.

Joffre set 14 August as the date when the First and Second armies were to invade Lorraine between Toul and Épinal, south of the German fortified area of Metz-Thionville. The First Army was to attack in the south with four corps, towards Sarrebourg 60 km (37 mi) east of Nancy and Donon, 25 km (16 mi) south of Sarrebourg. Passes in the Vosges to the south of Donon were to be captured before the main advance began. The Second Army was to attack towards Morhange 45 km (28 mi) north-east of Nancy, with two corps north of the First Army and three advancing successively behind the left flank of the corps to the south, to counter a German attack from Metz. The French offensive was complicated by the two armies diverging as they advanced, on difficult terrain particularly in the south, the combined fronts eventually being 150 km (93 mi) wide. The advances of the First and Second armies were to attract German forces towards the south, while a French manoeuvre took place in Belgium and Luxembourg, to pierce a weak point in the German deployment and then destroy the main German armies.

News that German forces were attacking towards the Meuse bridges south of Namur, led Joffre to expect a German attack from Mézières to Givet, 40 km (25 mi) further north, intended to envelop the French northern flank and another force to try to cross the Meuse from Montmédy to Sedan. On 12 August, Joffre allowed Lanrezac to move the I Corps west to Dinant on the Meuse and on 15 August, Joffre ordered the bulk of the Fifth Army to move north-west behind the Sambre. No large German force was expected to cross to the north of the Meuse, which made the French general staff certain that the German centre was weaker than expected. On 18 August, Joffre directed the Third, Fourth and Fifth armies, together with the Belgians and British, to attack the German armies around Thionville and Luxembourg, where 13–15 German corps were thought to have assembled. The Third and Fourth armies were to defeat German forces between Thionville and Bastogne, as they attacked westwards towards Montmédy and Sedan. The Fifth Army was to intercept German forces advancing towards Givet and then the Fourth Army was to swing north and attack the southern flank of the German armies. The Third and Fourth armies would defeat decisively the main German armies in the west and for this, two more corps were added to the four in the Fourth Army, taken from the flanking armies.

== Alsace ==
=== Battle of Mulhouse, 7–10 August ===
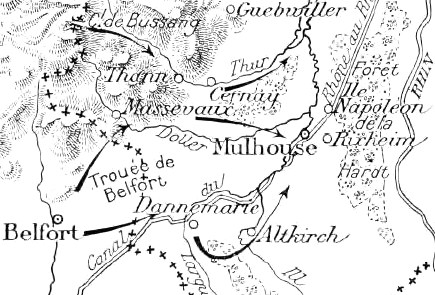
French capture of Mulhouse, 8 August 1914

The first French offensive of the war, known as the Battle of Mulhouse, began on 7 August. Joffre had directed the First and Second armies to engage as many German divisions as possible to assist French forces operating further north. The French VII Corps with the 14th and 41st divisions, under the command of General Bonneau, advanced from Belfort to Mulhouse and Colmar 35 km (22 mi) to the north-east. The French quickly seized the border town of Altkirch 15 km (9.3 mi) south of Mulhouse with a bayonet charge. On 8 August, Bonneau cautiously continued the advance and occupied Mulhouse, shortly after its German garrison had left the town. The First Army commander General Auguste Dubail preferred to dig in and complete the army mobilisation but Joffre ordered the advance to continue. With the arrival of two corps of the German 7th Army from Strasbourg, the Germans mounted a counter-attack on the morning of 9 August, at nearby Cernay. Mulhouse was recaptured on 10 August and Bonneau withdrew towards Belfort to escape a German encirclement.

General Paul Pau was put in command of a new Army of Alsace and Bonneau, the VII Corps commander, was Limogé (dismissed) by Joffre. VII Corps was reinforced with the 44th Division, the 55th Reserve Division, the 8th Cavalry Division and the 1st Group of Reserve Divisions (58th, 63rd and 66th Reserve divisions) to re-invade Alsace on 14 August, as part of the bigger offensive by the First and Second armies into Lorraine, which drew most of the German 7th Army northwards. The Army of Alsace began a new offensive against four Landwehr brigades, the VII Corps advancing from Belfort with two divisions on the right passing through Dannemarie, at the head of the valley of the Ill. On the left flank, two divisions advanced in co-operation with Chasseur battalions, which had moved into the Fecht valley on 12 August. On the evening of 14 August, Thann was captured and the most advanced troops had passed beyond the suburbs of Thann, Cernay and Dannemarie on the western outskirts of the city by 16 August. On 18 August, the VII Corps attacked Mulhouse and captured Altkirch on the south-eastern flank as the northern flank advanced towards Colmar and Neuf-Breisach.

The German defenders were forced back from high ground to the west of Mulhouse on both banks of the Doller and into the Mulhouse suburbs, where a house-to-house battle took place. The streets and houses of Dornach were captured systematically and by the evening of 19 August the French had recaptured the city. After being overrun, the Germans withdrew hastily through the Hardt forest to avoid being cut off and crossed the Rhine pursued by the French, retreating to Ensisheim, 20 km (12 mi) to the north. The French captured 24 guns, 3,000 prisoners and considerable amounts of equipment. With the capture of the Rhine bridges and valleys leading into the plain, the Army of Alsace had gained control of upper-Alsace. The French consolidated the captured ground and prepared to continue the offensive but on 23 August preparations were suspended, as news arrived of the defeats in Lorraine and Belgium; instead the French withdrew and consolidated the ridge beyond the Fortified region of Belfort. On 26 August the French withdrew from Mulhouse to a more defensible line near Altkirch, to provide reinforcements for the French armies closer to Paris. The Army of Alsace was disbanded and the VII Corps was transferred to the Somme. The 8th Cavalry Division was attached to the First Army and two more divisions were sent later.

== Belgium ==
=== Battle of Haelen, 12 August ===
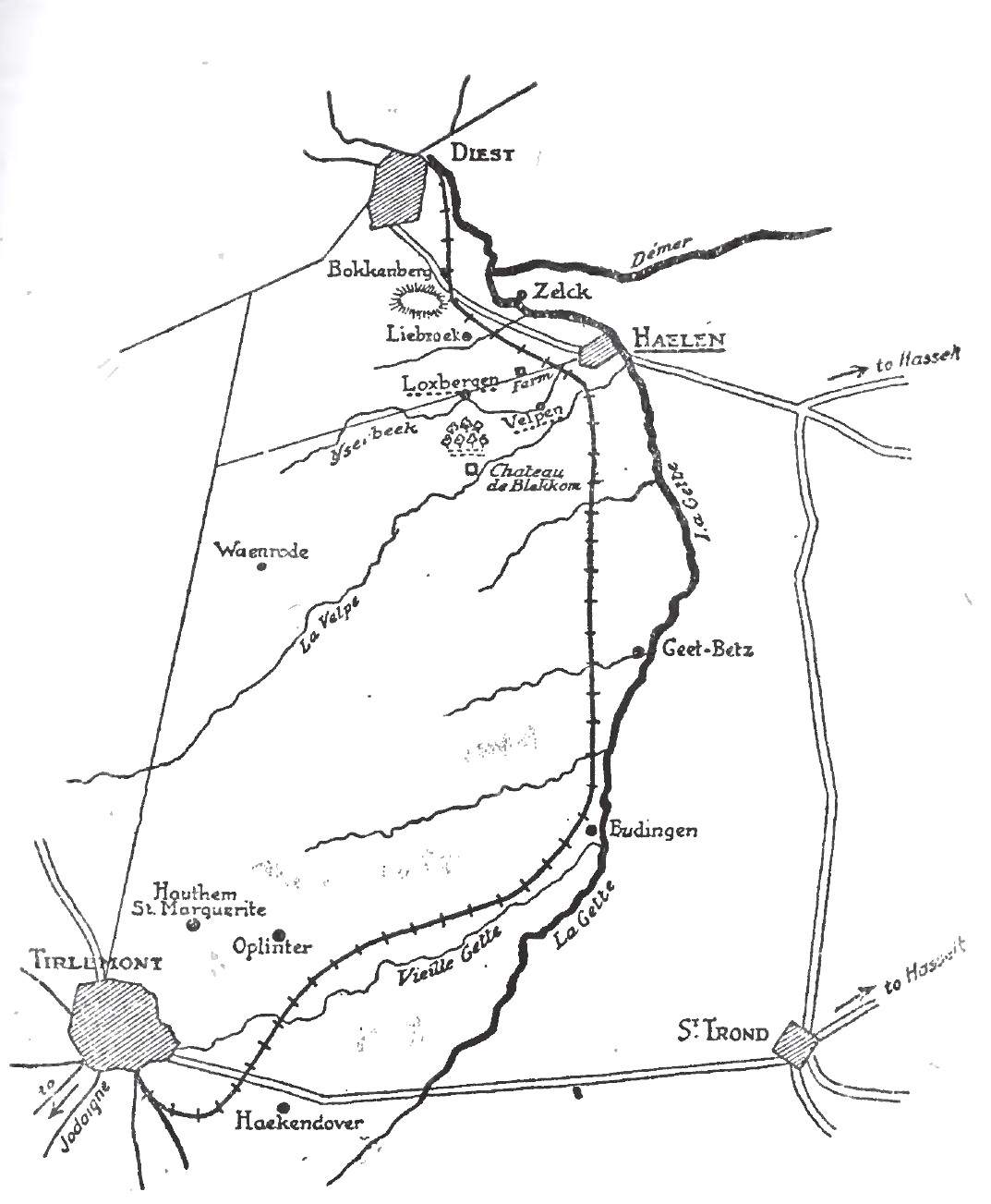
Map of Haelen, situated between the city of Diest to the north and Tienen (Tirelmont) to the south, 1914

The Battle of Haelen (Halen in Dutch) was a cavalry battle at the beginning of the First World War. Haelen was a small market town along the principal axis of advance of the German imperial army and provided a good crossing point over the River Gete. The battle took place on 12 August between German forces, led by Georg von der Marwitz and the Belgian troops commanded by Léon de Witte. Belgian engineers had blown the bridge over the Gete but the structure only partly collapsed and the Germans got c. 1,000 troops over it into the centre of Haelen. The main Belgian defence line was west of Haelen in terrain which gave only an obstructed view to the attacker. The 17th and 3rd Cavalry brigades assisted the Jäger in and south of Haelen, which enabled artillery to be brought to the fringe of the village but attacks into cornfields beyond were repulsed with many casualties, some cavalry becoming trapped by wire fences. The Jäger were also repulsed despite support from the 2nd Guards Machine-gun Detachment and dismounted cavalry sharpshooters.

Towards the end of the day Marwitz broke off the engagement; the 2nd Cavalry Division retired towards Hasselt and the 4th Cavalry Division withdrew to Alken. De Witte had repulsed the German cavalry attacks by ordering the cavalry, which included a company of cyclists and one of pioneers to fight dismounted and meet the attack with massed rifle fire, which inflicted significant casualties upon the Germans. The German cavalry had managed to obscure the operations on the German right flank and established a front parallel with Liège and discovered the positions of the Belgian field army but had not been able to penetrate beyond the Belgian front line and discover Belgian dispositions beyond. Although a Belgian victory, the battle had little strategic effect: the German armies besieged and captured the fortified regions of Namur, Liège and Antwerp, on which Belgian strategy depended.

== Lorraine ==
=== Battle of Lorraine, 14–25 August ===
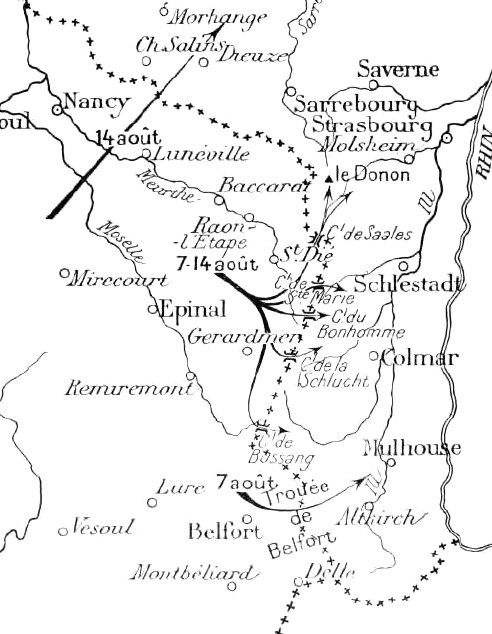
Initial moves, 7–20 August 1914

The main French offensive in the south began on 14 August when the First Army advanced with two corps into the Vosges and two corps north-east towards Sarrebourg and the two right-hand corps of the Second Army of General de Castelnau advanced on the left of the First Army. One corps and the Second Group of Reserve Divisions advanced slowly towards Morhange in echelon, as a flank guard against a German attack from Metz. The First Army had captured several passes further south since 8 August, to protect the southern flank as the army advanced to Donon and Sarrebourg. Despite warnings from Joffre against divergence, the army was required to advance towards the Vosges passes to the south-east, eastwards towards Donon and north-east towards Sarrebourg. German troops withdrew during the day, Donon was captured and on the left flank an advance of 10–12 km (6.2–7.5 mi) was made. At dusk, the 26th Division of the XIII Corps attacked Cirey but was repulsed by massed artillery and machine-gun fire and suffered a costly repulse. On 15 August, the Second Army reported that German long-range artillery had been able to bombard the French artillery and infantry undisturbed and that dug-in German infantry had inflicted many casualties on the French as they attacked.

The Second Army had to attack methodically after artillery preparation but managed to push back the German defenders. Intelligence reports identified a main line of resistance of the German 6th Army and 7th Army, which had been combined under the command of Crown Prince Rupprecht of Bavaria, close to the advanced French troops and that a counter-offensive was imminent. On 16 August, the Germans opposed the advance with long-range artillery fire and on 17 August, the First Army reinforced the advance on the city in the Battle of Sarrebourg. When the Germans were found to have left the city Joffre ordered the Second Army to incline further to the north, which had the effect of increasing the divergence of the French armies. A German counter-attack on 20 August forced separate battles on the French armies, which were defeated and forced to retreat in disorder. The German pursuit was slow and Castelnau was able to occupy positions east of Nancy and extend the right wing towards the south, to regain touch with the First Army. During 22 August, the right flank was attacked and driven back 25 km (16 mi) from the position where the offensive had begun on 14 August. The First Army withdrew but managed to maintain contact with the Second Army and on 24 August, both armies began a counter-offensive at the Battle of the Trouée de Charmes and regained the line of 14 August, by early September.

== Ardennes ==
=== Battle of the Ardennes, 21–23 August ===
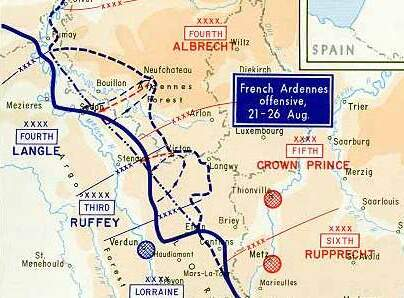
Battle of the Ardennes, 1914

Joffre issued instructions on 18 August but held back the Third and Fourth armies because air and cavalry reconnaissance found few German troops opposite the two armies, only a large force moving north-west 40–50 km (25–31 mi) away. On 19 August, the Fourth army of General Fernand de Langle de Cary, was ordered to occupy the bridges over the Semois but not to advance into Belgium until the German offensive began. A premature attack would advance into a trap, rather than give time for the Germans to empty Luxembourg of troops before the French advanced. On 20 August the German armies in the south attacked the French first and Second armies and next day the Third and Fourth armies began their offensive. The Fourth Army crossed the Semois and advanced towards Neufchâteau and the Third Army of General Pierre Ruffey attacked towards Arlon, as a right flank guard for the Fourth army.

South of Verdun, the Third Army was renamed Army of Lorraine and was to watch for a German offensive from Metz, which left the remainder of the Third Army free to concentrate on the offensive into Belgium. The French armies invaded Belgium with nine infantry corps but ten German corps and six reserve brigades of the 4th and 5th armies lay between Metz and the north of Luxembourg. The German 4th Army under Albrecht, Duke of Württemberg and 5th Army of Crown Prince Wilhelm had moved slower than the 1st, 2nd and 3rd armies and the French offensive towards them was reported on 21 August. The French armies had few maps and were unaware of the size of the German force opposite, as the Third Army brushed aside small German detachments. On 22 August in the Third army area, the V Corps attacked dug-in German troops at Longwy at 5:00 a.m. in thick fog and heavy rain, with no artillery support.

As the fog lifted, German artillery caught the French guns in the open and silenced them. A German counter-attack routed a French division and the corps was not rallied until the evening. To the north the IV Corps also advanced in fog and encountered German troops dug in near Virton and was forced back also with a division routed. On the southern flank, the VI Corps was pushed back a short distance. In the Fourth Army area, the II Corps on the right flank managed to keep level with the Third Army to the south but was not able to advance further. The Colonial Corps on the left was defeated at the Battle of Rossignol, 15 km (9.3 mi) south of Neufchâteau and had 11,646 casualties but the 5th Colonial Brigade on the left easily reached Neufchâteau, before it too was repulsed with many casualties. Further north, XII Corps advanced steadily but the XVII Corps beyond was outflanked and the 33rd Division lost most of its artillery. On the northern flank the XI and IX corps were not seriously engaged.

The French commanders were ordered by Joffre to continue the offensive on 23 August, as early as possible since his strategy depended on the success of the Third and Fourth armies. Ruffey replied in the morning that the attack could not begin until his divisions had reorganised and in the early afternoon, found that the Germans had forestalled another advance, by pushing the V Corps in the centre back for 8 km (5.0 mi), which led to the rest of the army falling back level. In the Fourth Army area, the 33rd Division of XVII Corps had been routed and the rest of the corps had withdrawn during the night of 22/23 August. The 5th Colonial Brigade withdrew from Neufchâteau before dawn on 23 August, exposing the right flank of XII Corps, which also fell back. By the end of 23 August the survivors of the Third and Fourth armies were back to their jumping-off positions except for the XI and IX corps on the northern flank.

== Sambre ==
=== Battle of Charleroi, 21–23 August ===
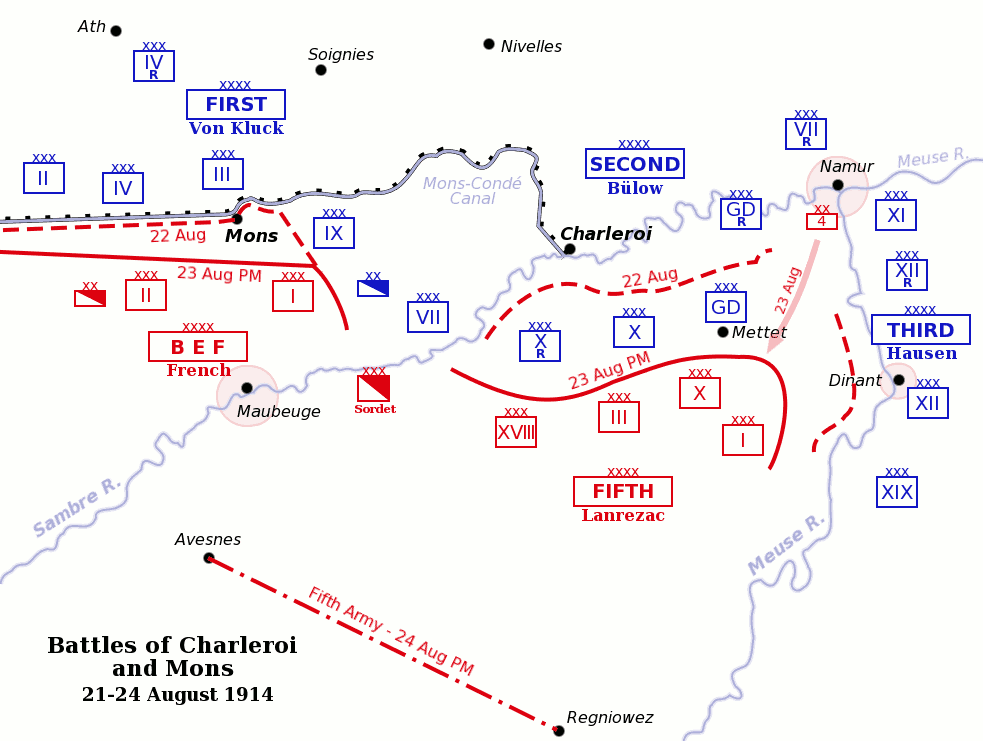
Map of the battles of Charleroi and Mons, 21–24 August

On 19 August the Fifth Army began to move into the angle of the Meuse and Sambre rivers close to Namur, which required a march of up to 100 km (62 mi) and took the army far beyond the left flank of the Fourth Army. Opposite the French were the 2nd and 3rd armies, with 18 divisions against the 15 French divisions. The I Corps held the west bank of the Meuse from Givet to Namur, X Corps faced north-west along the Sambre, with the III Corps to the west opposite Charleroi and the XVIII Corps further to the left. French cavalry on the left flank skirmished with German cavalry on 20 August and next day Joffre ordered the Fifth Army to advance, with the BEF on the left to find and attack the German forces west of the Meuse.

Before the French could cross the Sambre a German attack began between Namur and Charleroi and captured the Sambre bridges. On 22 August the French attacked to retake them but were repulsed in the centre. The I Corps was ordered to move north to Namur, which left 20 km (12 mi) of the Meuse defended by one reserve division and the 3rd Army was able to cross north of Givet. The I Corps drove part of the 3rd Army back across the river on 23 August but was not able to recapture Dinant. At the same time the BEF was attacked by the 1st Army at Mons. With the evacuation of Namur and news of the French Fourth Army retreating from the Ardennes, Lanrezac ordered a withdrawal around midnight towards Givet, which was the final French manoeuvre of the Battle of the Frontiers.

=== Battle of Mons, 23 August ===
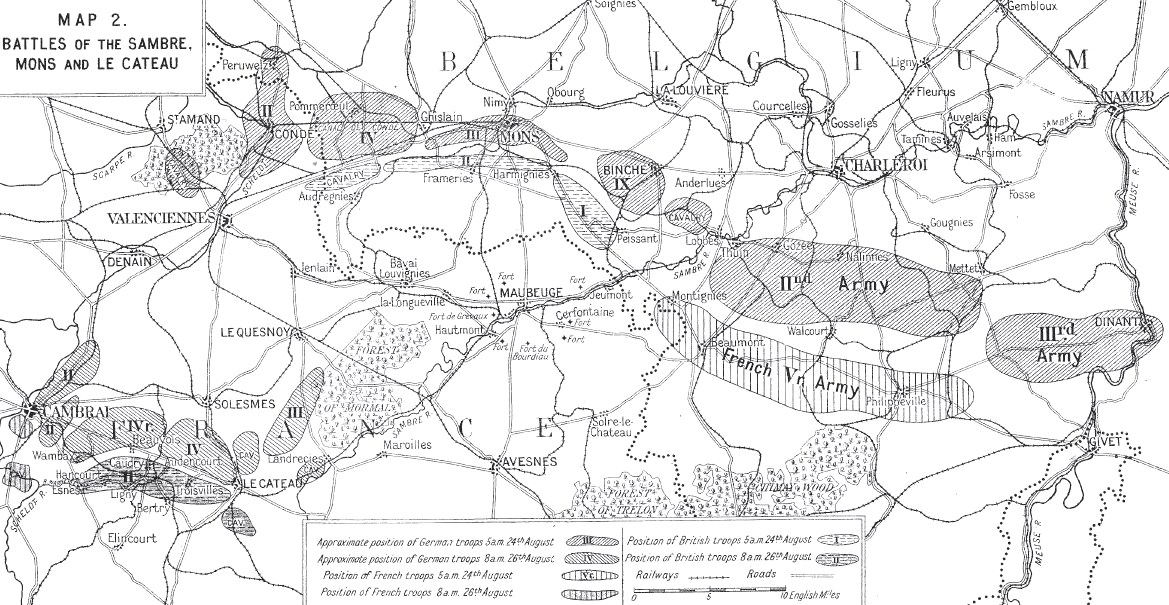
Dispositions: Battles of Mons and Charleroi, 21–23 August 1914

On 23 August, The German IX Corps advanced and part of the 35th Brigade got across the Mons–Condé Canal east of Nimy; reached the railway beyond in the early afternoon but was repulsed from the town. The 36th Brigade captured bridges at Obourg against determined resistance, after which the defenders at Nimy gradually withdrew; the bridges to the north were captured at 4:00 p.m. and the village captured. Mons was occupied unopposed but on higher ground to the east, the defence continued. The 17th Division advanced to the road from St Symphorien to St Ghislain. At 5:00 p.m. the divisional commander ordered an enveloping attack on the British east of Mons, who were pushed back after a stand on the Mons-Givry road. By 11:00 a.m. reports to Kluck revealed that the British were in St Ghislain and at the canal crossings to the west as far as the bridge at Pommeroeuil, with no troops east of Condé. With reports indicating that the right flank was clear of Allied troops, Kluck ordered the III Corps to advance through St Ghislain and Jemappes on the right of IX Corps and the IV Corps to continue towards Hensis and Thulies; the IV Corps was already attacking at the Canal du Centre and the II Corps and the IV Reserve Corps were following on behind the main part of the army.

Kluck ordered the attack to continue on 24 August, past the west of Maubeuge and that II Corps was to catch up behind the right flank of the army. IX Corps was to advance to the east of Bavai, III Corps was to advance to the west of the village, IV Corps was to advance towards Warnies-le-Grand 10 km (6.2 mi) further to the west and the II Cavalry Corps was to head towards Denain to cut off the British retreat. At dawn the IX Corps resumed its advance and pushed forwards against rearguards until the afternoon when the corps stopped the advance due to uncertainty about the situation on its left flank and the proximity of Maubeuge. At 4:00 p.m. cavalry reports led Quast to resume the advance, which was slowed by the obstacles of Maubeuge and III Corps. The staff at Kluck's headquarters, claimed that the two days' fighting had failed to envelop the British due to the subordination of the army to Bülow and the 2nd Army headquarters, which had insisted that the 1st Army keep closer to the western flank, rather than attack to the west of Mons. It was believed that only part of the BEF had been engaged and that there was a main line of defence from Valenciennes to Bavai and Kluck ordered it to be enveloped on 25 August.

== Aftermath ==
=== Analysis ===
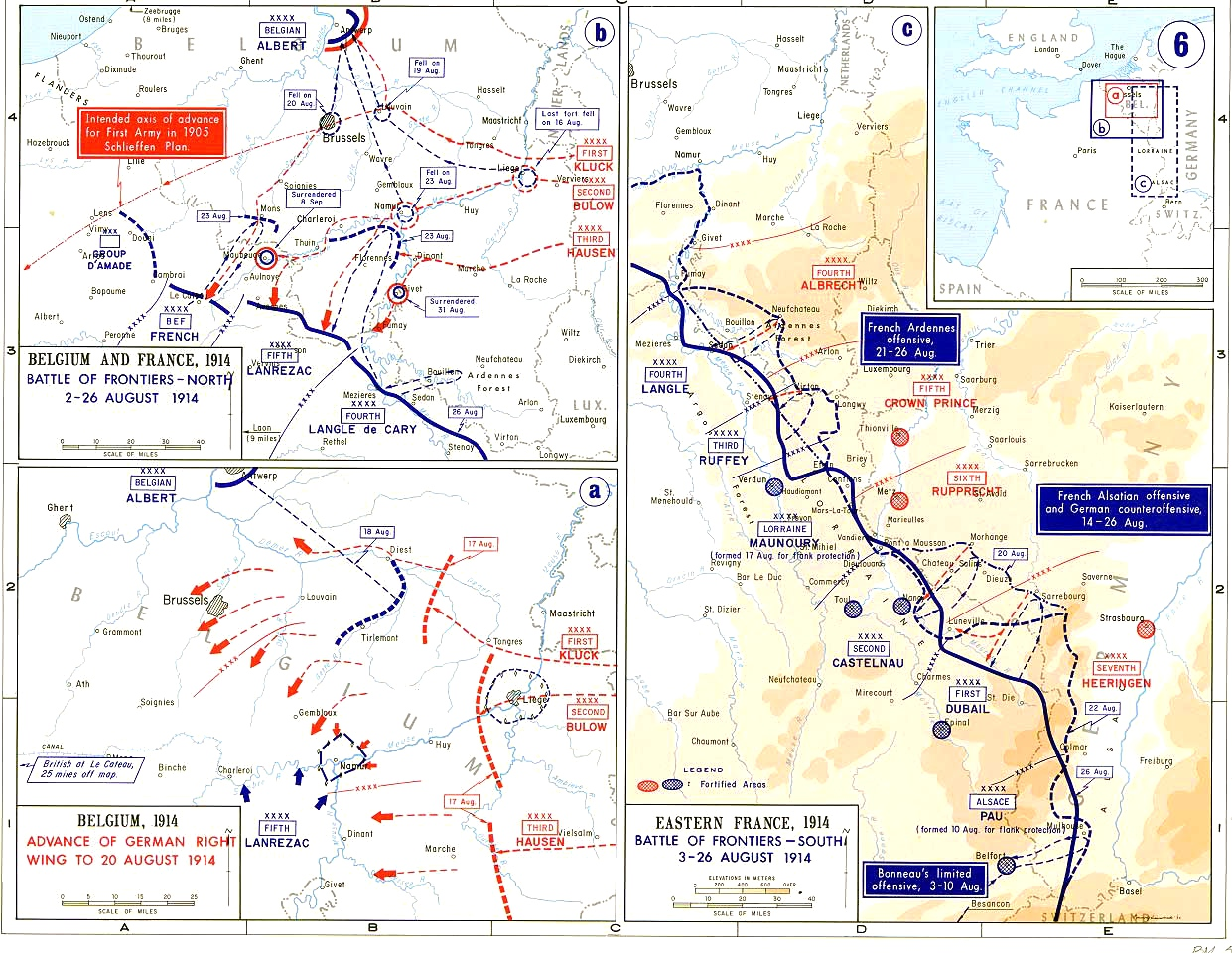
Summary map of the Battle of the Frontiers

The French offensive was defeated in a few days; on the right the First and Second armies advanced on 14 August and were back at their jumping-off points on 20 August. The offensive of the Third and Fourth armies was defeated from 21–23 August and the Fifth Army was defeated on the Sambre and forced to retreat during the same period. Joffre's strategy had failed due to an underestimation of the German armies and the dispersion of the French offensive effort. With a large German force operating in Belgium, the German centre had appeared to be vulnerable to the Third and Fourth armies. The mistaken impression of the size of the German force in Belgium or its approach route was not as significant as the faulty information about the strength of the German armies opposite the Third and Fourth armies. Joffre blamed others and claimed that the French infantry had failed to show offensive qualities, despite outnumbering the German armies at their most vulnerable point, a claim that Robert A. Doughty in 2005 called "pure balderdash".

The reality was that many of the French casualties were said to have come from an excess of offensive spirit and on 23 August, Ruffey concluded that the infantry had attacked without artillery preparation or support during the attack. Early on 24 August, Joffre ordered a withdrawal to a line from Verdun to Mézières and Maubeuge and began to transfer troops from the east opposite the German border, to the western flank. The French armies were to destroy railway facilities and inflict as many casualties as possible on the German armies, preparatory to resuming the offensive. Two strategic alternatives were possible, to attack the eastern flank of the 1st Army or to envelop the western flank of all the German armies. On 25 August, Joffre issued General Instruction No. 2, for a withdrawal to a line from Verdun to Reims and Amiens and the assembly of two corps and four reserve divisions near Amiens, for the envelopment operation. Joffre called for much greater integration of the infantry and artillery and for more tactical dispersal of infantry to nullify German fire power.

=== Casualties ===
In The World Crisis, Winston Churchill used figures from French parliamentary records of 1920 to give French casualties from 5 August to 5 September 1914 of 329,000 killed, wounded and missing, German casualties from August to November of 677,440 men and British casualties in August and September of 29,598 men. By the end of August, the French Army had suffered 75,000 dead, of whom 27,000 were killed on 22 August. French casualties for the first month of the war were 260,000, of which 140,000 occurred during the last four days of the Battle of the Frontiers. In 2009, Herwig recorded that the casualties in the 6th Army in August were 34,598, with 11,476 men killed and 28,957 in September with 6,687 men killed. The 7th Army had 32,054 casualties in August, with 10,328 men killed and 31,887 casualties in September with 10,384 men killed. In the 1st Army in August there were 19,980 casualties including 2,863 men killed and in the 2nd Army 26,222 casualties. In the last ten days of August, the 1st Army had 9,644 casualties and the 2nd Army had losses of 15,693 men. Herwig wrote that the French army did not publish formal casualty lists but that the Official History Les armées françaises dans la grande guerre gave losses of 206,515 men for August and 213,445 for September. During the battle, French casualties were c. 260,000 men, of whom c. 75,000 men were killed.

=== Subsequent operations ===
==== Great Retreat, 24 August – 5 September ====
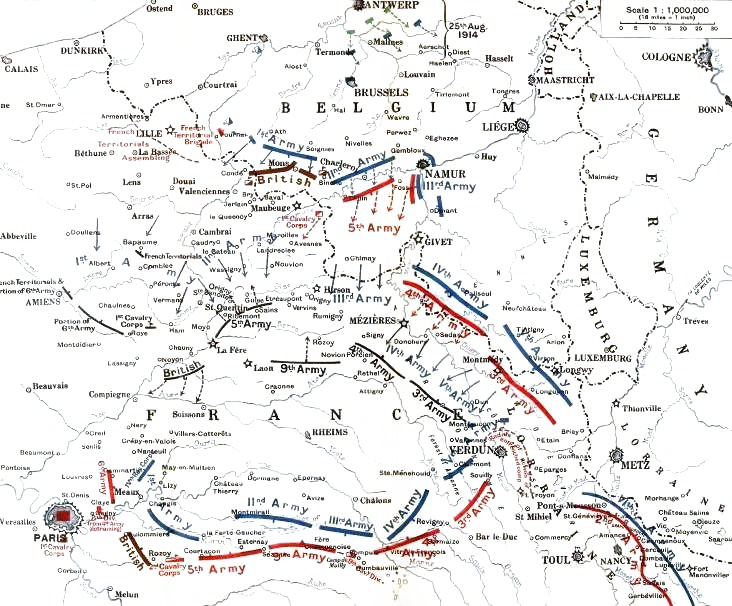
German and Allied positions, 23 August – 5 September 1914

The French Fifth Army fell back about 16 km (10 mi) from the Sambre during the Battle of Charleroi (22 August) and began a greater withdrawal from the area south of the Sambre on 23 August. The BEF fought the Battle of Mons on 24 August, by when the French First and Second armies had been pushed back by attacks of the German 7th and 6th armies between St Dié and Nancy, the Third Army held positions east of Verdun against attacks by the 5th Army, the Fourth Army held positions from the junction with the Third Army south of Montmédy, westwards to Sedan, Mezières and Fumay, facing the 4th Army and the Fifth Army was between Fumay and Maubeuge, with the 3rd Army advancing up the Meuse valley from Dinant and Givet into a gap between the Fourth and Fifth armies and the 2nd Army pressed forward into the angle between the Meuse and Sambre directly against the Fifth Army. On the far west flank of the French, the BEF prolonged the line from Maubeuge to Valenciennes against the 1st Army and Army Detachment von Beseler masked the Belgian army at Antwerp.

On 26 August, German forces captured Valenciennes and began the Siege of Maubeuge (24 August – 7 September). Leuven (Louvain) was sacked by German troops and the Battle of Le Cateau was fought by the BEF and the 1st Army. Longwy was surrendered by its garrison and next day British Marines and a party of the Royal Naval Air Service (RNAS) landed at Ostend; Lille and Mezières were occupied by German troops. Arras was occupied on 27 August and a French counter-offensive began at the Battle of St Quentin (Battle of Guise 29–30 August). On 29 August the Fifth Army counter-attacked the 2nd Army south of the Oise, from Vervins to Mont Dorigny and west of the river from Mont Dorigny to Moy towards St Quentin on the Somme, while the British held the line of the Oise west of La Fère. Laon, La Fère, and Roye were captured by German troops on 30 August and Amiens the next day. On 1 September Craonne and Soissons were captured and on 5 September the BEF ended its retreat from Mons, German troops reached Claye, 16 km (10 mi) from Paris, Reims was captured, German forces withdrew from Lille and the First Battle of the Marne (Battle of the Ourcq) (5–12 September) began, marking the end of the Great Retreat of the western flank of the Franco-British armies.

By 4 September the First and Second armies had slowed the advance of the 7th and 6th armies west of St Dié and east of Nancy, from where the Second Army had withdrawn its left flank, to face north between Nancy and Toul. A gap between the left of the Second Army and the right of the Third Army at Verdun, which faced north-west, on a line towards Revigny against the 5th Army advance, west of the Meuse between Varennes and St Ménéhould. The Fourth Army had withdrawn to Sermaize, west to the Marne at Vitry le François and then across the river to Sompons, against the 4th Army, which had advanced from Rethel, to Suippes and the west of Chalons. The new Ninth Army held a line from Mailly against the 3rd Army, which had advanced from Mézières, over the Vesle and the Marne west of Chalons. The 2nd Army had advanced from Marle on the Serre, across the Aisne and the Vesle, between Reims and Fismes to Montmort, north of the junction of the Ninth and Fifth armies at Sezanne. The Fifth Army and the BEF had withdrawn south of the Oise, Serre, Aisne and Ourq, pursued by the 2nd Army on a line from Guise to Laon, Vailly and Dormans and by the 1st Army from Montdidier, towards Compiègne and then south-east towards Montmirail. The new French Sixth Army, linked with the left of the BEF, west of the Marne at Meaux, to Pontiose north of Paris. French garrisons were besieged at Strasbourg, Metz, Thionville, Longwy, Montmédy and Maubeuge. The Belgian army was invested at Antwerp in the National redoubt and at fortress troops continued the defence of the Liège forts.

==== Battle of Grand Couronné, 4–13 September ====
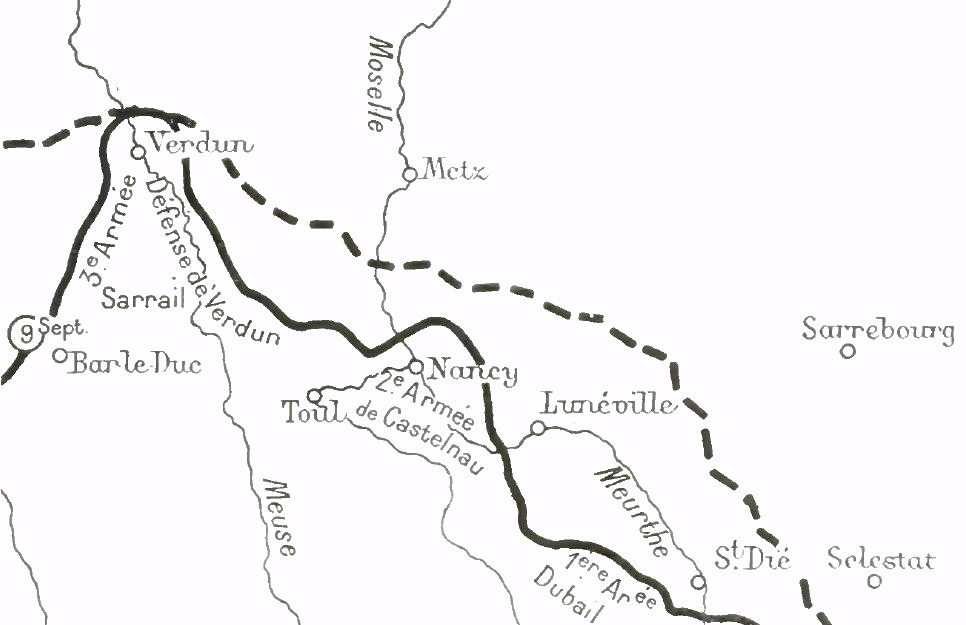
Nancy area, September 1914

The German offensive began during the night of 3 September against the fortifications of the Grand Couronné, either side of Nancy, which pushed back the 2nd Group of Reserve Divisions, comprising the 59th, 68th and 70th Reserve Divisions under General Léon Durand, to the north and the XX Corps of General Balfourier to the south, by the evening of 4 September. In the afternoon of 5 September Castelnau telegraphed to Joffre that he proposed to evacuate Nancy, to preserve the fighting power of the army. Next day Joffre replied that the Second Army was to hold the area east of Nancy if at all possible and only then retire to a line from the Forest of Haye to Saffais, Belchamp and Borville.

The civilian authorities in the city had begun preparations for an evacuation but the troops on the Grand Couronné repulsed German attacks on the right flank, during 5 September. The Reserve divisions were only pushed back a short distance on the front to the east and north of Nancy. An attempt by Moltke to withdraw troops from the 6th Army, to join a new 7th Army being formed for operations on the Oise failed when Rupprecht and Dellmensingen were backed by the Emperor who was at the 6th Army headquarters. (Note: The German Emperor waited in the 6th Army headquarters at Dieuze to be present at a great victory but returned to Luxembourg in the evening.) German attacks continued on 6 September and XX Corps conducted a counter-attack which gave the defenders a short period to recuperate but the troops of the 2nd Group of Reserve Divisions, east and north of Nancy, began to give way.

On 7 September German attacks further north drove a salient into the French defences south of Verdun at St Mihiel, which could force apart the Second and Third armies. At Nancy, part of the 59th Reserve Division retreated from the height of St Geneviève, which overlooked the Grand Couronné north-west of Nancy, exposing the left flank of the Second Army and Nancy to envelopment. Castelnau ordered a withdrawal from Nancy but the move was circumvented by his staff; Castelnau was ordered by Joffre to maintain the defence of the Grand Couronné for another 24 hours. (Note: Castelnau had received news that one of his sons had been killed and gave the orders while under the shock of bereavement.) The Germans had retired during the afternoon and the French reoccupied the height. German attacks continued until the morning of 8 September but then diminished as Moltke began to withdraw troops to the right flank of the German armies. Moltke sent Major Roeder to the 6th Army with orders to end the offensive and prepare to retire to the frontier; only now did Rupprecht find out that the armies near Paris were under severe pressure. The attacks by the 6th Army diminished and on 10 September it began to withdraw towards the frontier. On 13 September, Pont-à-Mousson and Lunéville were re-occupied by the French unopposed who then closed up to the Seille river, where the front stabilised until 1918.

==== First Battle of the Marne, 5–12 September ====
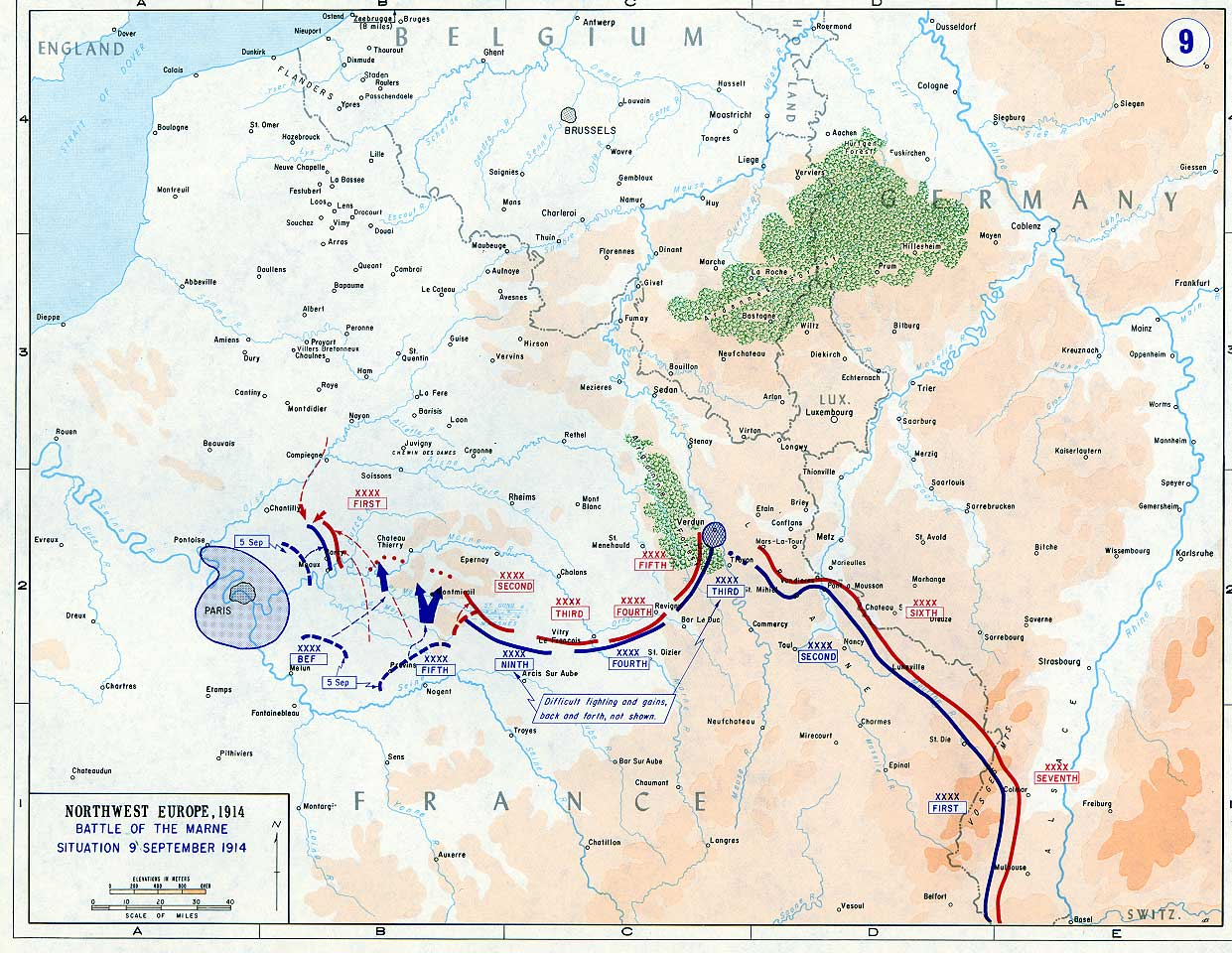
Battle of the Marne, 1914

Joffre used the railways which had transported French troops to the German frontier to move troops back from Lorraine and Alsace to form a new Sixth Army under General Michel-Joseph Maunoury with nine divisions and two cavalry divisions. By 10 September twenty divisions and three cavalry divisions had been moved west from the German border to the French centre and left and the balance of force between the German 1st–3rd armies and the Third, Fourth, Ninth, Fifth armies, the BEF and Sixth Army had changed to 44:56 divisions. Late on 4 September Joffre ordered the Sixth Army to attack eastwards over the Ourcq towards Château Thierry as the BEF advanced towards Montmirail and the Fifth Army attacked northwards, with its right flank protected by the Ninth Army along the St Gond marshes. The French First–Fourth armies to the east were to resist the attacks of the German 5th–7th armies between Verdun and Toul and repulse an enveloping attack on the defences south of Nancy from the north. The 6th and 7th armies were reinforced by heavy artillery from Metz and attacked again on 4 September along the Moselle.

On 5 September the Sixth Army advanced eastwards from Paris and met the German IV Reserve Corps, which had moved into the area that morning and stopped the French short of high ground north of Meaux. Overnight the IV Reserve Corps withdrew to a better position 10 km (6.2 mi) east and French air reconnaissance observed German forces moving north to face the Sixth Army. General Alexander von Kluck the 1st Army commander, ordered the II Corps to move back to the north bank of the Marne, which began a redeployment of all four 1st Army corps to the north bank by 8 September. The swift move to the north bank prevented the Sixth Army from crossing the Ourcq but created a gap between the 1st and 2nd Armies. The BEF advanced from 6 to 8 September, crossed the Petit Morin, captured bridges over the Marne and established a bridgehead 8 km (5.0 mi) deep. The Fifth Army also advanced into the gap and by 8 September crossed the Petit Morin, which forced Bülow to withdraw the right flank of the 2nd Army. Next day the Fifth Army re-crossed the Marne and the German 1st and 2nd armies began to retire as the French Ninth, Fourth and Third armies fought defensive battles with the 3rd Army which was forced to retreat with the 1st and 2nd armies on 9 September.

Further east the Third Army was forced back to the west of Verdun as German attacks were made on the Meuse Heights to the south-east but managed to maintain contact with Verdun and the Fourth Army to the west. German attacks against the Second Army south of Verdun from 5 September almost forced the French to retreat but on 8 September the crisis eased. By 10 September the German armies west of Verdun were retreating towards the Aisne and the Franco-British were following up, collecting stragglers and equipment. On 12 September Joffre ordered an outflanking move to the west and an attack northwards by the Third Army to cut off the German retreat. The pursuit was too slow and on 14 September, the German armies dug in north of the Aisne and the Allies met trench lines rather than rearguards. Frontal attacks by the Ninth, Fifth and Sixth armies were repulsed on 15–16 September, which led Joffre to begin the transfer of the Second Army west to the left flank of the Sixth Army, the first phase of the Race to the Sea, reciprocal attempts by the contending armies to outflank their opponent, which from 17 September to 17–19 October moved the opposing armies through Picardy and Flanders to the North Sea coast.
