= Louis Victor Plessier =

French soldier

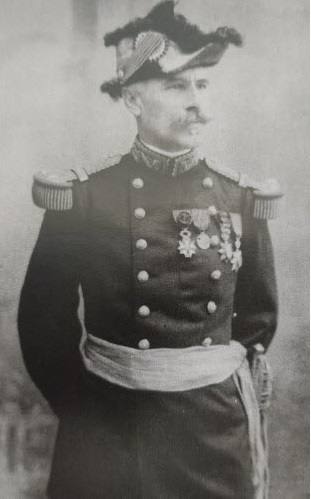
- Born: 19 May 1856; Provins, Seine-et-Marne
- Died: 27 August 1914 (aged 58); Lyon
- Military career
- Allegiance: France
- Branch: French Army
- Service years: 1874–1914 (DOW)
- Rank: Général de brigade
- Conflicts: Sino-French War (1884–1886), First World War (1914)
- Awards: Commander of the Legion of Honour

Louis Victor Plessier (19 May 1856 – 27 August 1914) was a French general. Joining the army in 1874 Plessier fought in the Sino-French War and in Algeria. As a general in the First World War he led his brigade during the Battle of Mulhouse where he was wounded by German fire. Plessier, hit in three places in his spine, succumbed to his wounds eight days later in hospital. He is sometimes regarded as the first French officer to be killed during the war: although four other generals died before he did, his mortal wound was the first.

== Early life and career ==
Plessier was born at 11pm on 19 May 1856 at Provins, Seine-et-Marne to Louis Francois Plessier, a lawyer, and his wife Victoire Toureau. He volunteered for the French Army on 19 October 1874 and entered the École spéciale militaire de Saint-Cyr on 21 October 1874. Ranked 355th out of his class of 395 cadets, he was commissioned as a sous-lieutenant (second lieutenant) in the 96th Line Infantry Regiment on 22 September 1876. He attended the French Army's musketry school at Valbonne from 15 October 1877 to 5 January 1878 and was ranked 35th of 55 students.

Promoted to lieutenant on 13 October 1882 in the 121st Line Infantry Regiment, Plessier transferred to the 3rd Marine Infantry Regiment on 5 July 1884. He fought in the Sino-French War in Tonkin and Cambodia between 10 August 1884 and 9 December 1886 and, during an action at Angkor Chey on 12 June 1886, was wounded by a bullet in his left shoulder. Plessier was mentioned in dispatches for his actions in Indo-China, received the Tonkin Expedition commemorative medal and, on 7 July 1887, was appointed a chevalier of the Order of Cambodia. Following his return from the campaign, on 12 November 1886 he was promoted to the rank of capitaine (captain).

Plessier transferred to the 27th Infantry Regiment on 12 April 1887 and to the 152nd Infantry Regiment on 12 October 1887 before joining the 1st Foreign Regiment on 8 August 1889 for service in Algeria. He remained in Algeria with the Foreign Legion, where he served as adjutant, until his regiment was sent to form part of the army of occupation in Annam and Tonkin on 3 November 1889. Plessier returned to French Indo-China where he served until 1 June 1892, whereupon the regiment returned to Algeria, and received an appointment in the Order of the Dragon of Annam on 17 October 1892 for his service. He was also made a chevalier of the Legion of Honour on 10 July 1891. He remained in Algeria until his transfer back to Metropolitan France with the 51st Infantry Regiment on 11 September 1892.

In 1893 Plessier married Alice-Thérèse-Marie-Amélie Dumant and, on 2 October 1895, was promoted to chef de bataillon (major) in the 160th Infantry Regiment. Plessier received promotion to the rank of lieutenant-colonel in the 91st Infantry Regiment on 13 July 1902 and was appointed an officer of the Legion of Honour on 12 July 1905, at which point he was serving as commander of 1st Infantry Group of the Verdun fortress.

== First World War ==
Plessier was promoted to général de brigade (brigadier general), commanding the 88th Infantry Brigade, on 19 June 1913 and was appointed deputy military governor of Lyon and chief assistant to the commander of Rhône. Upon the outbreak of war Plessier formed his brigade at Lyon and travelled with it by rail to Grandvillars. The unit took part in the French offensive from Dannemarie towards Mulhouse, which was then part of Germany, and saw action at Altkirch and Illfurth.

Plessier was leading a reconnaissance expedition at Geisberg Hill, near Zillisheim on 19 August when he was hit by three bullets in his spinal cord. He was transported back to the Desgenettes military hospital in Lyon but died there of his injuries at 2pm on 27 August.

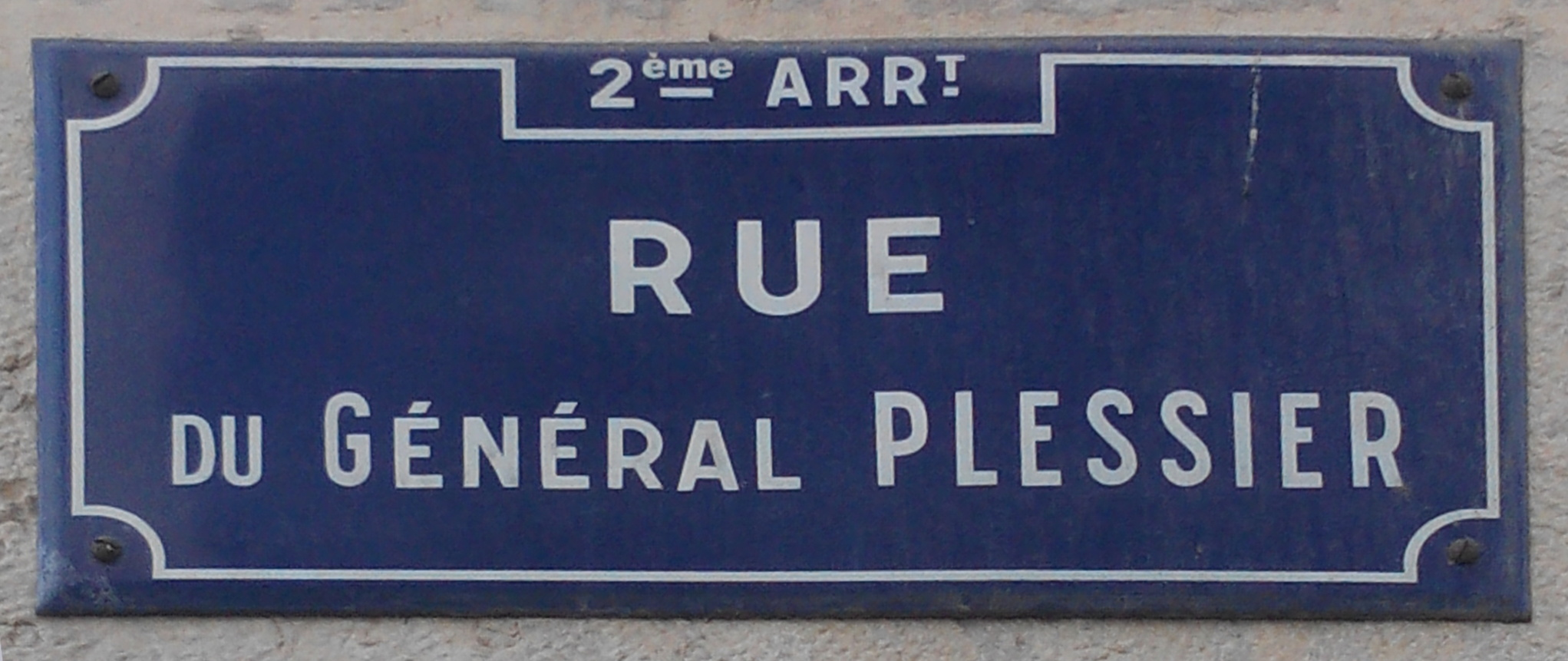
Street sign in Rue du Général Plessier in Lyon

Plessier is sometimes considered the first French general to be killed during the war; four other generals pre-deceased him (Raffenel, Rondony, Diou and Deffontaines), but Plessier received his mortal wound first. Plessier was posthumously appointed a commander of the Legion of Honour on 16 May 1915, backdated to 21 August 1914. His death, and that of the 600 men of his brigade who died on 19 August, is commemorated by a memorial obelisk in Mulhouse. A street in the 2nd arrondissement of Lyon is named in his honour.
