= Louis Bonneau =

French Army General

- Born: 7 July 1851; Wissembourg, France
- Died: 26 February 1938 (aged 86); Nancy, France
- Military career
- Allegiance: France
- Service years: 1870–1914
- Rank: Major General
- Commands: VII Corps
- Conflicts: Battle of Borny; Battle of Saint-Privat; Battle of Noisseville; Battle of the Frontiers; Battle of Mulhouse

Louis Bonneau (7 July 1851 – 26 February 1938) was a French Army General de Division who commanded the VII Army Corps at the start of World War I.

== Biography ==
Louis Bonneau was born in Wissembourg, Alsace, France on 7 July 1851. Louis joined the French Army in 1868 and fought in the Franco-Prussian War two years later. He was given command of the cavalry brigade of the II Army Corps in 1903, the 41st Infantry Division in 1907, and the VII Army Corps in 1910, and he commanded the corps at Mulhouse during the 1914 Battle of the Frontiers at the start of World War I. His corps were unprepared for the rapid German counterattack during the Battle of Mulhouse and forced to abandon Alsace shortly after liberating it, resulting in Bonneau's dismissal by General Joseph Joffre.
