= Harry Jungbluth =

Harry Alfred Jungbluth (Mons, Belgium, 27 April 1847 – Brussels, 27 March 1930) was a Belgian general, who was head of the military household of King Albert I between 1912 and 1930.

During World War I he was sidelined for political reasons, exiled to Le Havre, and represented King Albert in the Belgian government in exile.

On 9 July 1919 he was awarded the United States Distinguished Service Medal. The citation noted that it was for "exceptionally meritorious and distinguished service in a position of great responsibility to the Government of the United States, during World War I" in his provision of advice to the US in his roles as chief of the military household and adjutant-general.
