= Zillisheim =

Commune in Grand Est, France

Zillisheim Zìllesa (in Haut Rhin Alsatian)
- Commune
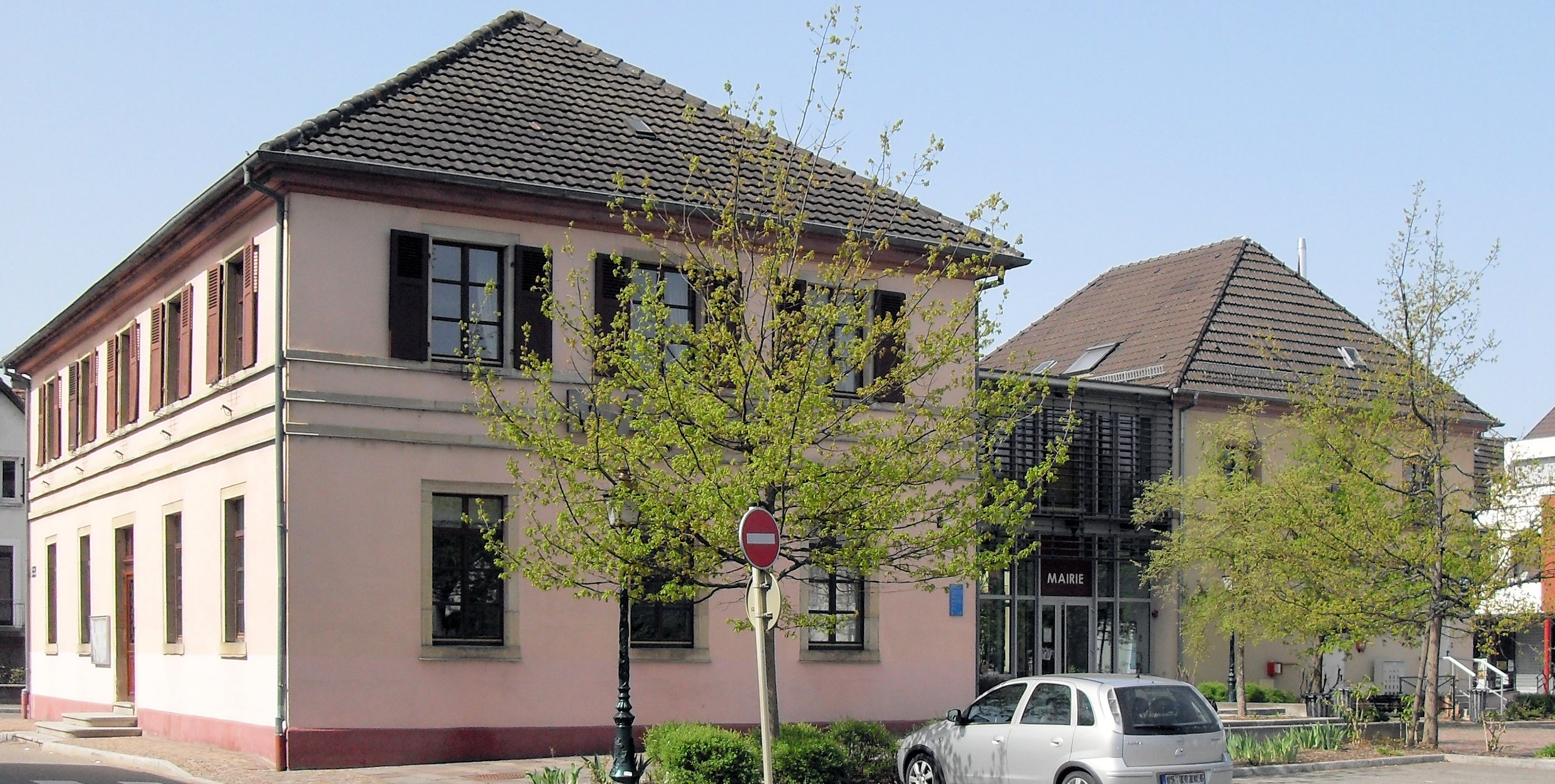
- The town hall in Zillisheim

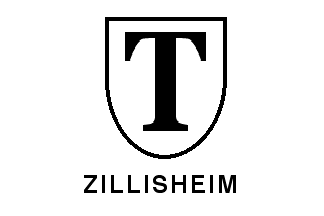
- Flag Coat of arms
- Location of Zillisheim
- Location within France Location within Grand Est
- Coordinates: 47°41′46″N 7°17′47″E
- Country: France
- Region: Grand Est
- Department: Haut-Rhin
- Arrondissement: Mulhouse
- Canton: Brunstatt-Didenheim
- Intercommunality: Mulhouse Alsace Agglomération

Government
  - Mayor (2020–2026): Michel Laugel
- Area^{1}: 8.22 km^{2} (3.17 sq mi)
- Elevation: 252 m (827 ft)
- Highest elevation: 404 m (1,325 ft)
- Lowest elevation: 247 m (810 ft)
- Population (2023): 2,561
  - Density: 312/km^{2} (807/sq mi)
- Demonym(s): Zillisheimois, Zillisheimoises
- Time zone: UTC+01:00 (CET)
  - Summer (DST): UTC+02:00 (CEST)
- INSEE/Postal code: 68384 /68720
- ^{1} French Land Register data, which excludes lakes, ponds, glaciers > 1 km^{2} (0.386 sq mi or 247 acres) and river estuaries.

Zillisheim (Alsatian: Zellesa or Zìllesa) is a commune in the Haut-Rhin department of Alsace in north-eastern France. It forms part of the Mulhouse Alsace Agglomération, the inter-communal local government body for the Mulhouse conurbation.

== Population ==
Historical population

Year	Pop.	±% p.a.
1793	930	—
1800	855	−1.19%
1806	941	+1.61%
1821	1,018	+0.53%
1831	1,176	+1.45%
1836	1,267	+1.50%
1841	1,270	+0.05%
1846	1,331	+0.94%
1851	1,318	−0.20%
1856	1,236	−1.28%
1861	1,316	+1.26%
1866	1,318	+0.03%
1871	1,525	+2.96%
1875	1,268	−4.51%
1880	1,604	+4.81%
1885	1,646	+0.52%
1890	1,360	−3.75%
1895	1,367	+0.10%
1900	1,362	−0.07%

Year	Pop.	±% p.a.
1905	1,587	+3.11%
1910	1,654	+0.83%
1921	1,190	−2.95%
1926	1,486	+4.54%
1931	1,621	+1.75%
1936	1,904	+3.27%
1946	1,643	−1.46%
1954	1,754	+0.82%
1962	1,435	−2.48%
1968	1,758	+3.44%
1975	1,951	+1.50%
1982	1,936	−0.11%
1990	1,919	−0.11%
1999	2,356	+2.31%
2007	2,549	+0.99%
2012	2,631	+0.64%
2017	2,572	−0.45%
2023	2,561	−0.07%

Source: EHESS (1793-1999) and INSEE

== See also ==
- Communes of the Haut-Rhin department
