= Paul Pau =

French general (1848–1932)

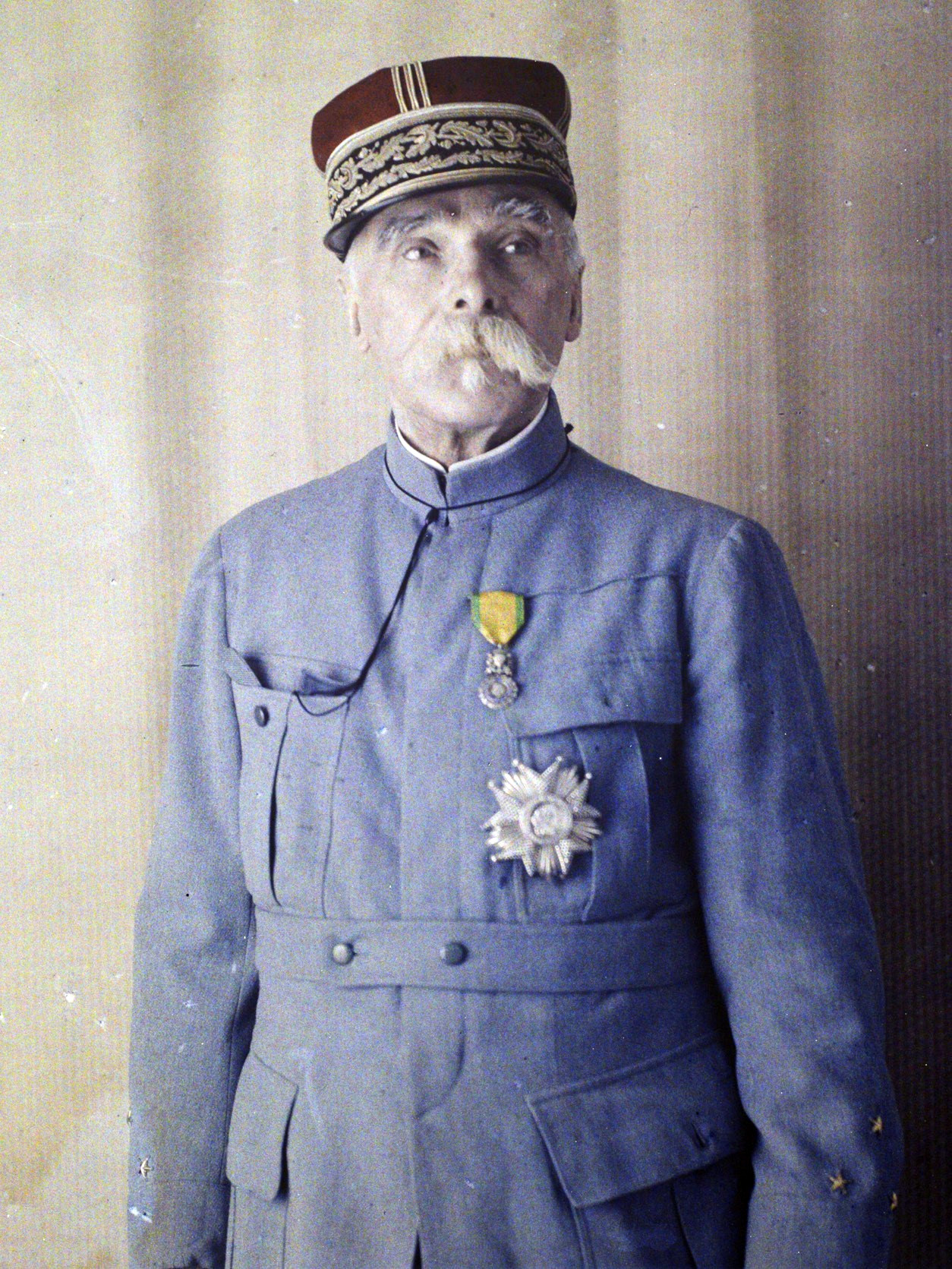
Autochrome by Auguste Léon, 1920

Paul Marie César Gérald Pau (29 November 1848, Montélimar – 2 January 1932) was a French soldier and general who served in the Franco-Prussian War and in World War I.

He took part in the Franco-Prussian War, suffering the loss of his lower right arm. By 1903, he had reached the rank of General, but he retired from active service in 1911. He was offered the position of Army Chief of Staff by War Minister Adolphe Messimy, but was removed from consideration due to his anti-republican political views and his insistence on the authority to personally nominate generals for high commands. The position instead passed to Joseph Joffre, who would become the French commander-in-chief during World War I.

When war broke out in 1914, General Joffre recalled Pau from retirement to command the Army of Alsace to participate in the attacks towards Alsace called for by Plan XVII. The Army of Alsace contained VII Corps (which had taken but failed to hold Mulhouse between 7 and 10 August), 44th Division, the 55th Reserve Division, the 8th Cavalry Division and the 1st Group of Reserve Divisions (58th, 63rd and 66th Reserve divisions).

Although initially successful, Pau was forced to withdraw after the defeat of the First Army at Morhange-Sarrebourg. When it was clear to Joffre that French hopes for a quick victory in Alsace had faded and that France now faced the real possibility of quick defeat (caused by the Schlieffen Plan), Pau's army was broken up and sent north to join Maunoury's Sixth Army in time to participate in the First Battle of the Marne. He was photographed holding his cutlass while reviewing troops and decorating a unit's flag in the second reel of the American silent war-front documentary War As It Really Is (1916).

After this, Pau was not given another field command. After serving in the French Supreme War Council, he was sent in January 1916 as French representative to the Russian high command, known as the Stavka. Pau also toured Australia and New Zealand between September 1918 and January 1919 with the French Mission on a post-war diplomatic visit. While in New Zealand a kauri, Agathis australis, was named the 'General Pau' in his honor.

He died in Paris in 1932.
