= Army of Alsace (1914) =

French field army of the First World War

The Army of Alsace (French: Armée d'Alsace) was a French field army of the First World War that operated from 11 to 28 August 1914.

== Formation ==
On 7 August 1914, the French VII Corps (General Bonneau) captured Mulhouse but were forced out three days later by German counter-attacks. Bonneau was dismissed by Joffre and the VII Corps was expanded, becoming the Armée d'Alsace under command of Paul Pau.

The reinforcements were

- 44th Division
- 55th Reserve Division
- 58th Reserve division
- 63rd Reserve division
- 66th Reserve division
- 8th Cavalry Division

A new attack was launched, Mulhouse was taken and the Germans were even pushed over the Rhine. French defeats in Lorraine and the Ardennes forced the Armée d'Alsace to withdraw from Mulhouse, to a more defensible line near Altkirch and to provide reinforcements for the French armies closer to Paris.

== Disbandment ==
The army was disbanded on 28 August and many of its units distributed among the remaining French armies. The units that remained in Southern Alsace, came under the First Army and received the name of Groupement des Vosges, which became the 34th Army Corps on 22 October 1914. On 8 December 1914, with the stabilisation of the Western Front, more units were added to this sector and they formed the independent détachement d'Armée des Vosges/détachement d'Armée Putz under General Henri Putz. On 4 April 1915, the force became the Seventh Army.
