= 57th Infantry Division (France) =

57th Infantry Division was an infantry division of the French Army during the First World War. It was deployed overseas, seeing action on the Salonika front, fighting alongside British troops. It was sent to the Crimea in December 1918 as part of the Army of the Danube.

== Commanders ==
- August 1914 - 2 February 1915 : General Bernard
- 3 February - 7 May 1915 : General Victor Cordonnier
- 8 May - 17 June 1915 : General Marie Eugène Debeney
- 18 June - 11 August 1915 : General Demange
- 12 August - 22 October 1915 : General de Cadoudal
- 23 October 1915 – 15 January 1917 : General Paul Leblois
- 16 January - 13 December 1917 : General Jacquemot
- 14 December 1917 – 4 March 1918 : General Siben
- 5 March 1918 - end of the conflict : General Génin
- 1939 : General Barbeyrac de Saint-Maurice
- 1940 : General Texier

== First World War ==
=== 1914 ===
- 6–9 August : Elements detached to the 7th Army Corps during the offensive in Mulhouse.

9–10 August : fighting in Mulhouse then withdrawal of the elements towards Brinighoffen.

- 10–16 August : offensive movement towards the Ill river, in the Carspach region, Brinighoffen. From 11 August, withdrawal by Dannemarie, Haut-Rhin towards Petit-Croix.

13 August : fighting around Montreux-Vieux and Montreux-Château, then occupation of this region.

- 16–28 August : resumption of the offensive in the direction of Mulhouse (Battle of Alsace), from 21 August occupation of the Altkirch region, then 24 August, withdrawal to Dannemarie.
- 28 August 1914 – 8 October 1915 : occupation of a sector east of Belfort. Offensive reconnaissance between the Doller and the Swiss border.

11 November : engagement by the Carspach woods.
2 December: Combat around Ammerzwiller.
25–26 December : French attacks in the Aspach, Haut-Rhin region .
7–8 January 1915 : fighting near Burnhaupt-le-Haut .
27 January : fighting around Ammerzwiller and Burnhaupt-le-Bas.
2 April, 11 June : German attacks towards Ammerzwiller.

=== 1915 ===
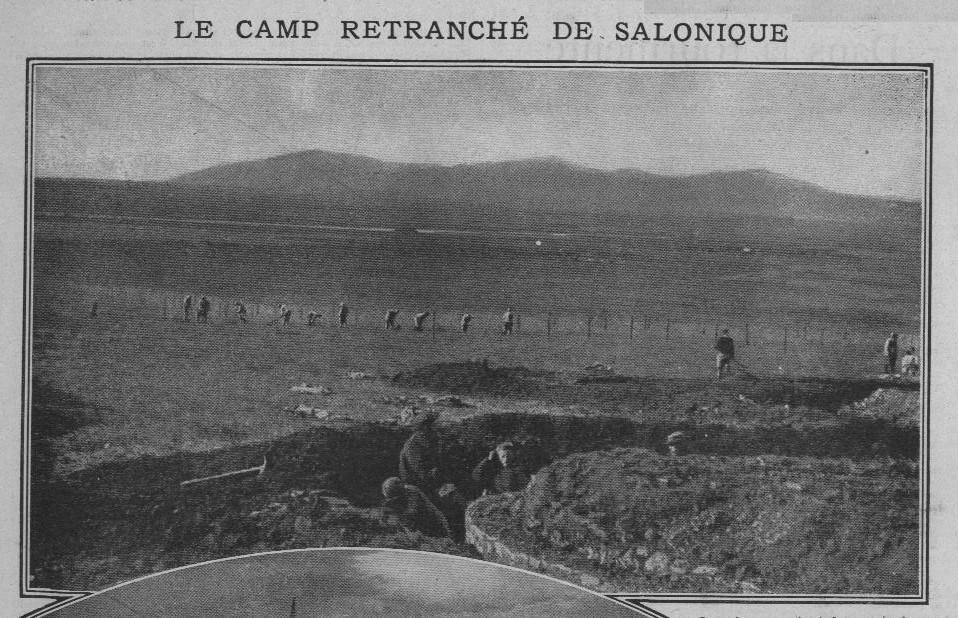
The lines of earthworks around Salonika, French troops dig trenches to defend the city.

- 8–15 October : withdrawal from the front, transport by rail to the Valbonne camp; rest. From 14 October, transport by rail to Toulon and Marseille. From 15 October, embarkation to be transported to join the Army of the Orient .
- 15 October - 3 December : transport by sea and disembarkation in Salonika; as the landings proceed, transport by rail to Krivolak and Demir Kapiya; occupation of the valley of the Vardar and the gorges of Demir Kapija, up to the confluence of the Vardar and the Crna River (Vardar). From 27 October, local actions north of Krivolak.

5 November : elements engaged towards the Tchitchevo monastery. Then preparation and manning of a defensive position towards Demir Kapiya.

- 3–19 December : retreat to Salonika, withdrawal of elements from the Krivolak region towards Demir Kapiya.

5–6 December : defence of their position.
7 December : retreat to Guevgheli (Gevgelija).
10–11 December : establishing a position towards Doiran (Dojran) and Guevgheli (actions towards Fourka). From 12 December, withdrawal along the railway line from Kilindir (Kalindria in the municipality of Cherso) to Salonika as far as Naresh where the division arrives on 18 December.

- 19 December 1915 – 5 May 1916 : creation of the entrenched camp of Salonika, between Kiorziné (Xirochori) and Dogandji (Prochoma), in conjunction with the British front. Elements are despatched on 21 March to Sarigöl (near Kilkis), thence on 1 April up to Alexia (Milochori, Kilkis), then to Snevce.

=== 1916 ===
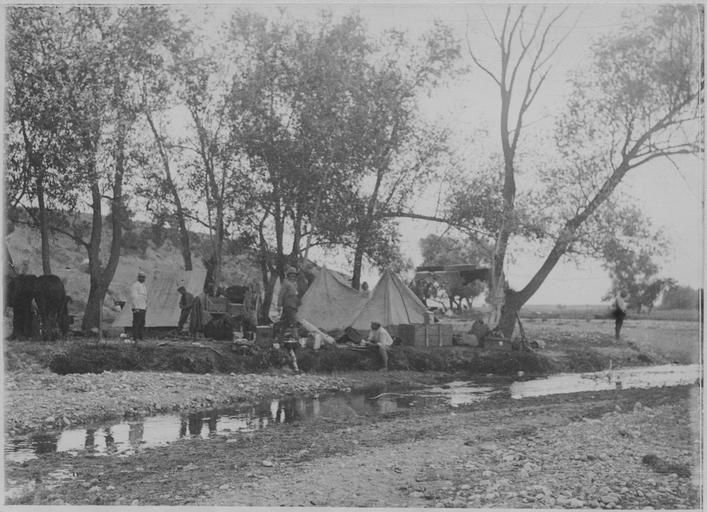
The outpost of the Officer Commanding the 41st Battery of the 5th Field Artillery Regiment. Taken at Leptokarya in the Florina sector on 22 September 1916.

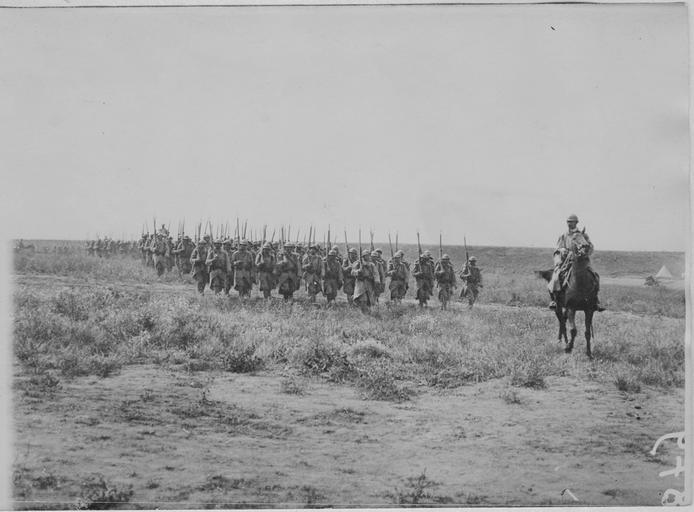
Dismounted troopers of a squadron of the 13th Regiment of Chasseurs à cheval of the Groupe Léger on parade. Taken at Gefyra, Thessaloniki on 3 June 1916.

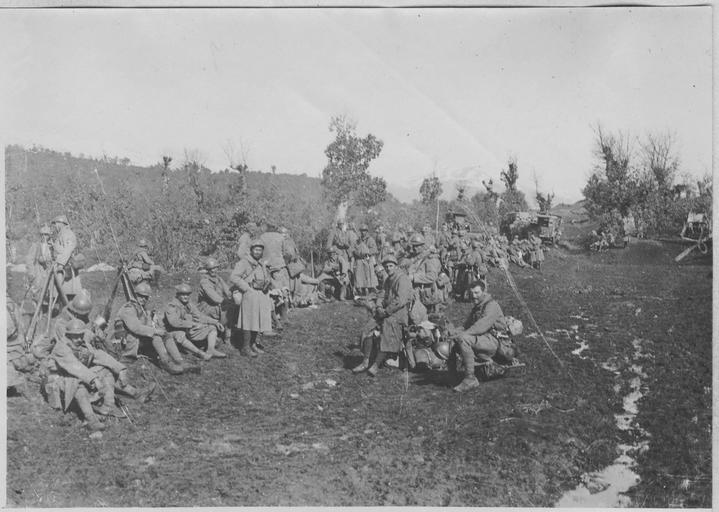
West of Lake Prespa (January - March 1917). Infantrymen at rest. Opposite them, the peaks occupied by the enemy.

- 5 May - 28 August : movement of the division towards the Kroucha-Balkan, preparation of the Dova-Tépé position (between Anatoli, Serres & Sugovo (Platanakia, Serres) ), Botkova lake (Lake Kerkini). Engagement on the southern slopes of the Bélèch mountain ridge (near Nikoliḱ), during the battle of Doiran (1916). The division's 113th Brigade was reinforced by the Groupe Léger of six dismounted cavalry squadrons, which equated to the strength of an infantry battalion.
- 28 August - 3 October : relief by Italian elements and subsequent withdrawal from the front line. Transport by rail from Sarigöl to Veria, engaged in the allied counter-offensive on Monastir . Progression beyond Ekshi Su (Xino Nero), on 14 September.

17 September : capture of Florina.
18 September : occupation of a front towards the south of Arménohor (Armenochori, Greece) and the north of Florina and Pisoderi (detached elements, during this progression to the south-east of Lake Prespa).

- 3 October 1916 – 28 March 1917 : pursuit on the crests Baba-Planina engaged in the battle of Monastir (1917). Fighting on the fortified lines of Kenali (sh:Kremenica (Bitolj)), resultant withdrawal of troops from the Central Powers.

15 November : capture of Gradešnica and Velušina.
19 November : occupation of the land conquered north of Monastir (Bitola), south of Hill 1248.
13–28 March 1917 : attack towards Hill 1248 and the heights to the northeast. Then fortification of the territory captured in this region.

=== 1917 ===
- 28 March - 14 August : in the second line towards Rakovo, then at the beginning of April redeployed to the sector of Hill 1248.

14–16 May : fighting towards Hill 1248.

- 14–29 August : withdrawal from the front line and rest in the region south of Florina
- 29 August 1917 – 10 June 1918 : A provisional grouping (57th and 156th Division) is dispatched to the west of the Prespa Lakes and engaged in operations at Pogradec (7 - 12 September, 21 September, 19 and 20 October). At the end of 1917, after regrouping, taking up of positions in a sector in Albania in the region covering Krachnichti, Lounga, Pléchichta, Mali Sat mountain range.

=== 1918 ===
- 10 June - 15 September : engaged in operations in Albania, fighting in Kamia and progress to Sinaprénté and Koukri; battles of Bofnia then fortification of the captured positions.
- 15 September - 20 October : present during the breakthrough of the Macedonian front, offensive on Okrida (Ohrid) and progression to Elbasan.
- 20 October - 11 November : withdrawal from the front line, movement towards Lopatitsa (Lopatica, Bitola), then towards Monastir (Bitola); rest.

=== Order of battle ===
- Infantry :

- 113th Brigade

235th Infantry Regiment from August 1914 to November 1916
260th Infantry Regiment from August 1914 to November 1918
371st Infantry Regiment from August 1914 to November 1918

- 114th Brigade

242nd Infantry Regiment from August 1914 to October 1917
244th Infantry Regiment from August 1914 to October 1916
372nd Infantry Regiment from August 1914 to March 1919

- A Tabor of Albanians commanded by Essad Pasha Toptani
- A Groupe Léger of six dismounted light cavalry squadrons, which equated to the strength of an infantry battalion. (One squadron was from the 11th Hussars, the remainder were from the 3rd, 13th, 17th, 18th and 22nd regiments of Chasseurs à cheval.) This formation arrived in 1915 and was disbanded on 15 June 1917, its personnel being transferred to the depot of the 4th Regiment of Chasseurs d'Afrique. They were attached to the Division, but were never formally a part of the Division

- Cavalry :

1 Squadron of the 11th Dragoon Regiment from August 1914 to October 1915
1 Squadron of the 18th Dragoon Regiment from August 1914 to October 1915
1 Squadron of the 4th Regiment of Chasseurs D'Afrique from November 1915 to November 1918

- Artillery :

2 groupes (2x 3x 75mm batteries) from the 5th Field Artillery Regiment from August 1914 to July 1917
1 groupe (3x 75mm) from the 47th Field Artillery Regiment from August 1914 to July 1917

All nine of the 75mm batteries above were merged to form the 204th Field Artillery Regiment from July 1917 to November 1918

2 batteries of 65mm from the 1st Mountain Artillery Regiment from January 1916 to December 1917
1 battery of 65mm from the 8th Africa Artillery Group from January 1916 to December 1917

All three of the 65mm batteries above were merged to form the 1st Group of the 1st Mountain Artillery Regiment from January 1918 to November 1918

110th Battery of 58mm mortars from the 1st Mountain Artillery Regiment from January 1916 to December 1917

The above redesignated as the 101st Battery (of 58mm mortars) of the 204th Field Artillery Regiment from January 1918 to November 1918

- Engineers :

Field Companies (28/1, 21/28) from the 28th Battalion, 2nd Engineer Regiment from August 1914 to July 1915

== Second World War ==
On 10 May 1940, the 57th Division, under the command of General Texier, is attached to the 45th fortress corps that is integrated with the 6th Army (France).

On that date the 57th infantry division consists of:

- 235th Infantry Regiment ;
- 260th Infantry Regiment ;
- 8th demi-brigade, of the 26th, 66th and 68th battalions of Chasseurs à pied;
- 47th divisional artillery regiment ;
- 247th divisional heavy artillery regiment ;
- 62nd reconnaissance group (divisional cavalry)

and all the divisional supporting services (sapper field companies, signals, motor transport company, divisional medical group, logistics for both warlike and non-warlike stores, Divisional HQ staff etc.).
