= Train Thur Doller Alsace =

A non-profit organisation which runs trains from Cernay St André to Sentheim.

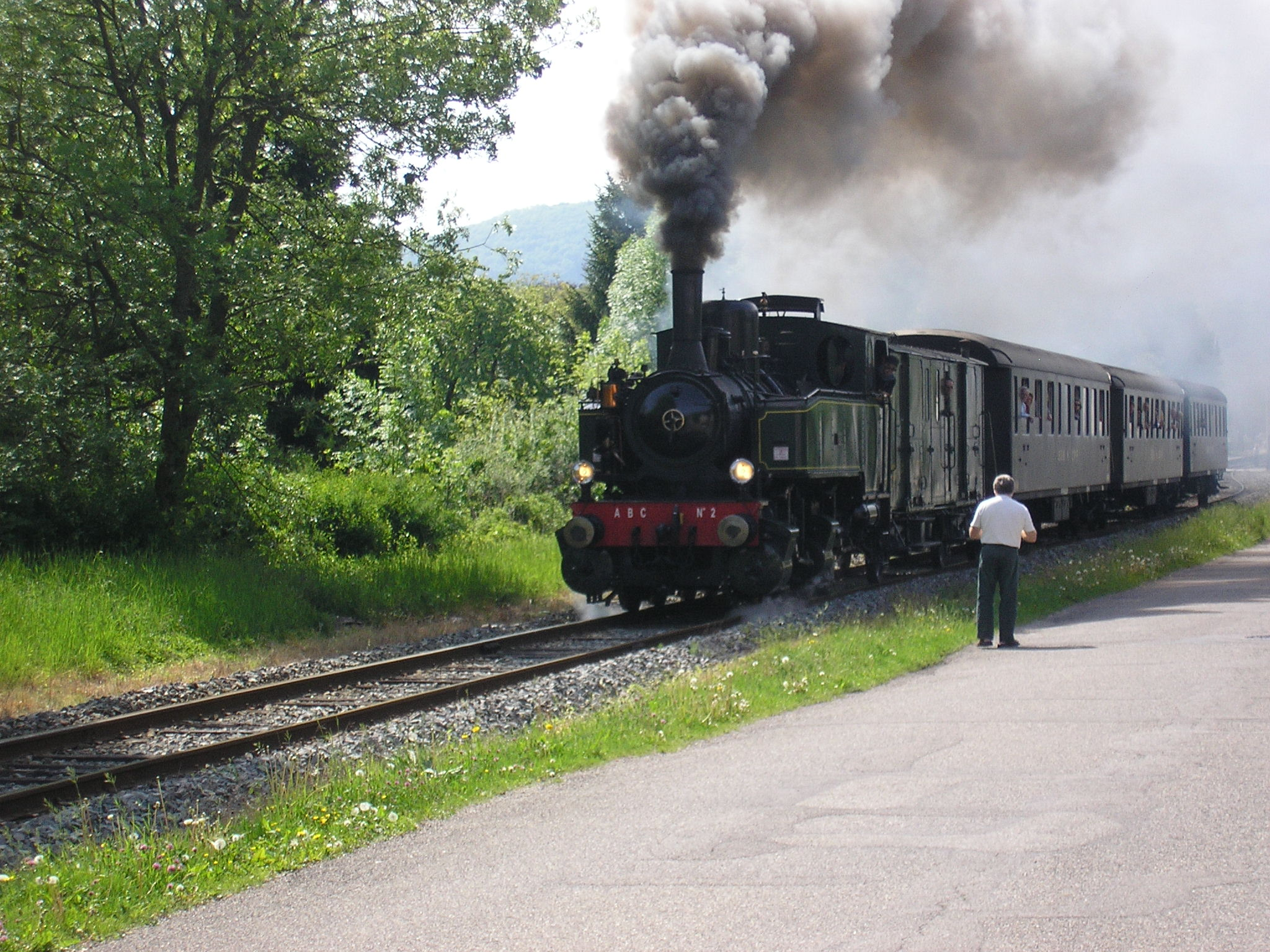
- A steam train in the Doller Valley
- Terminus: Sentheim

Preserved operations
- Stations: 5
- Length: 13.6 km
- Preserved gauge: standard gauge

Commercial history
- Opened: 30 June 1869
- Closed to passengers: 1967
- Closed: 1973

Preservation history
- 1976: The line reopens as a heritage railway.

Website
- https://www.train-doller.org/en/

The Train Thur Doller Alsace, formerly chemin de fer de la vallée de la Doller, is a heritage railway located in Alsace in the Haut-Rhin. It is managed by the TTDA association, loi de 1901, which offers heritage railway journeys with steam or diesel traction, on a 13.65 km section between Cernay-Saint-André and Sentheim of the old line from Cernay to Sewen. The track, with a standard gauge of 1435 mm, winds through the Thur and Doller valley.

== Regular train journeys in the Summer season ==
From June to September, the TTDA offers, every Sunday and public holiday, two round-trip trips between Cernay-Saint-André station and Sentheim station. In July and August they also run two trains a day on Wednesdays. A schedule is published each year and is available on the association's website: Train Thur Doller Alsace.

== Themed trains all year round ==
Upon reservation, private trains and school trains can be organized on request.

On the 27 August 2017, a 1900s themed train was organised where the volunteers dress up in period clothing.

There is a Halloween train and Christmas train.

The best known is the western themed one which has been organized for at least the last 25 years which is a two day event on Saturday and Sunday.

== History ==
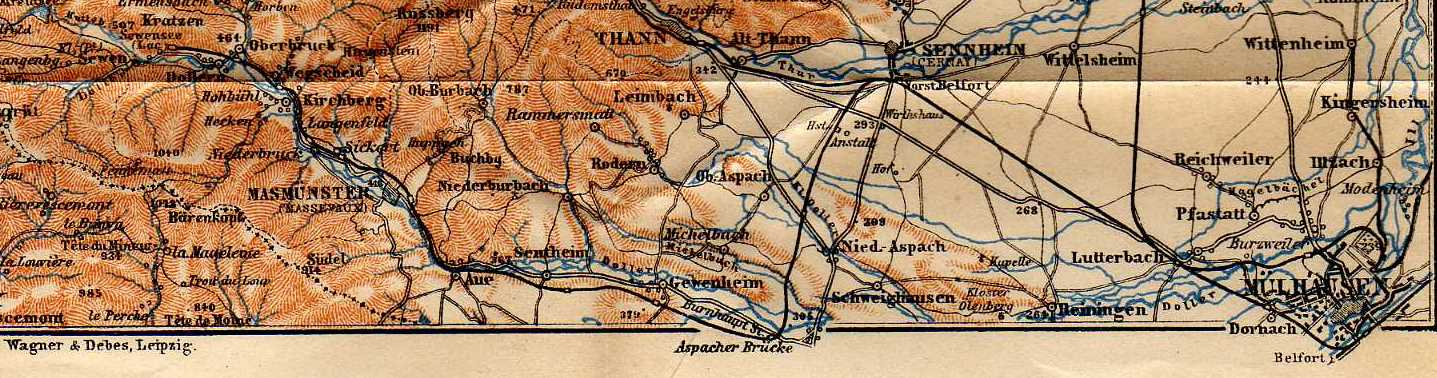
Detail of a German map (Wagner & Debes, circa 1900) showing the course of the Doller Valley line

Inaugurated on the 30 June 1869, the line from Cernay to Sentheim serves the upper Doller valley; it originally continued to Sewen. After having suffered the consequences of the wars of 1914-1918 and 1939-1945, its usage declined until the cancellation of passenger trains in 1967, it was removed from the network in 1973. In 1976, the Chemin de Fer Touristique de la Vallée de la Doller Association (CFTVD) re-established the link between Cernay-Saint-André and Sentheim, setting up one of the first heritage railways.

The Train Thur Doller Alsace (TTDA) association is a "non-profit association under local law", law of 1908, created in 1971, it was called "Chemin de Fer Touristique de la Vallée de la Doller (CFTVD)" until 2006, when it took on its current name. Its object is "the preservation of historic railway heritage for tourism purposes". Statutorily, the association is made up of volunteers and managed by a board of directors of 9 members elected at a general meeting. Its head office is located at 1 rue Latouche in Cernay and it is chaired by Mr. Romain Tricot.

Anyone can become a volunteer, an active or benefactor member. The operation of a heritage railway offers many types of actions, the active members participate in the operation of the TTDA, according to their interests, their skills, and their availability. When joining, the new member completes a "Membership form", including a questionnaire indicating the list of possible activities: reception with information and sales at the bar or in the souvenir shop; animation with organizations: events, from the station of the artists, and themed trains; operation with the various useful positions during train circulations, in particular: steam engine driver, fireman, diesel train driver, Gard, crossing guard, ticket inspector; the technique, with the positions allowing the conservation and maintenance of the railway heritage of the TTDA: maintenance and servicing, sheet metal mechanics, welding, carpentry, masonry and painting.

== Railway infrastructure ==
The line includes along its 13.65 km track:

- 6 stations:
  - Cernay-Saint-André station ( 47° 47′ 28″ N, 7° 09′ 18″ E ): this railway stop currently serves as the starting point for the heritage railway; located at the entrance to Cernay, there is a platform and a booth for selling tickets. The line being cut at the level of the national road 66, there is no connection from the Cernay SNCF station located in the city centre.
  - Aspach-le-Haut station ( 47° 46′ 10″ N, 7° 08′ 32″ E ), former station on the line;
  - Burnhaupt-le-Haut station ( 47° 44′ 31″ N, 7° 08′ 01″ E ), former station on the line; the TTDA has set up a three-track depot and its rolling stock maintenance and restoration workshop there.;
  - Guewenheim station ( 47° 44′ 56″ N, 7° 05′ 30″ E ), former station on the line;
  - Sentheim station ( 47° 45′ 09″ N, 7° 03′ 27″ E ), a former station on the line which has retained its original appearance with its goods shed. Now the terminus station for the heritage railway, the TTDA presents railway objects and organizes artist exhibitions there.;
- 18 level crossings (15 unguarded and 3 with manual barriers), 21 points;
- 24 524 sleepers and 147 336 lag screws for attaching the rails to the sleepers;
- The Henry Bridge type 1916.
- The Doller bridge.

== Filmography ==
In 2007, scenes from the fictional documentary TV film "La Résistance" are filmed on the line, with trains from the association (in some shots we can see the CFTVD logo on a wagon), to illustrate the deportation of Jews from France to Germany, and the resistance organized by railway workers and mechanics.
