= Tumba Peak (Belasica) =

Tumba
- Τούμπα, Тумба
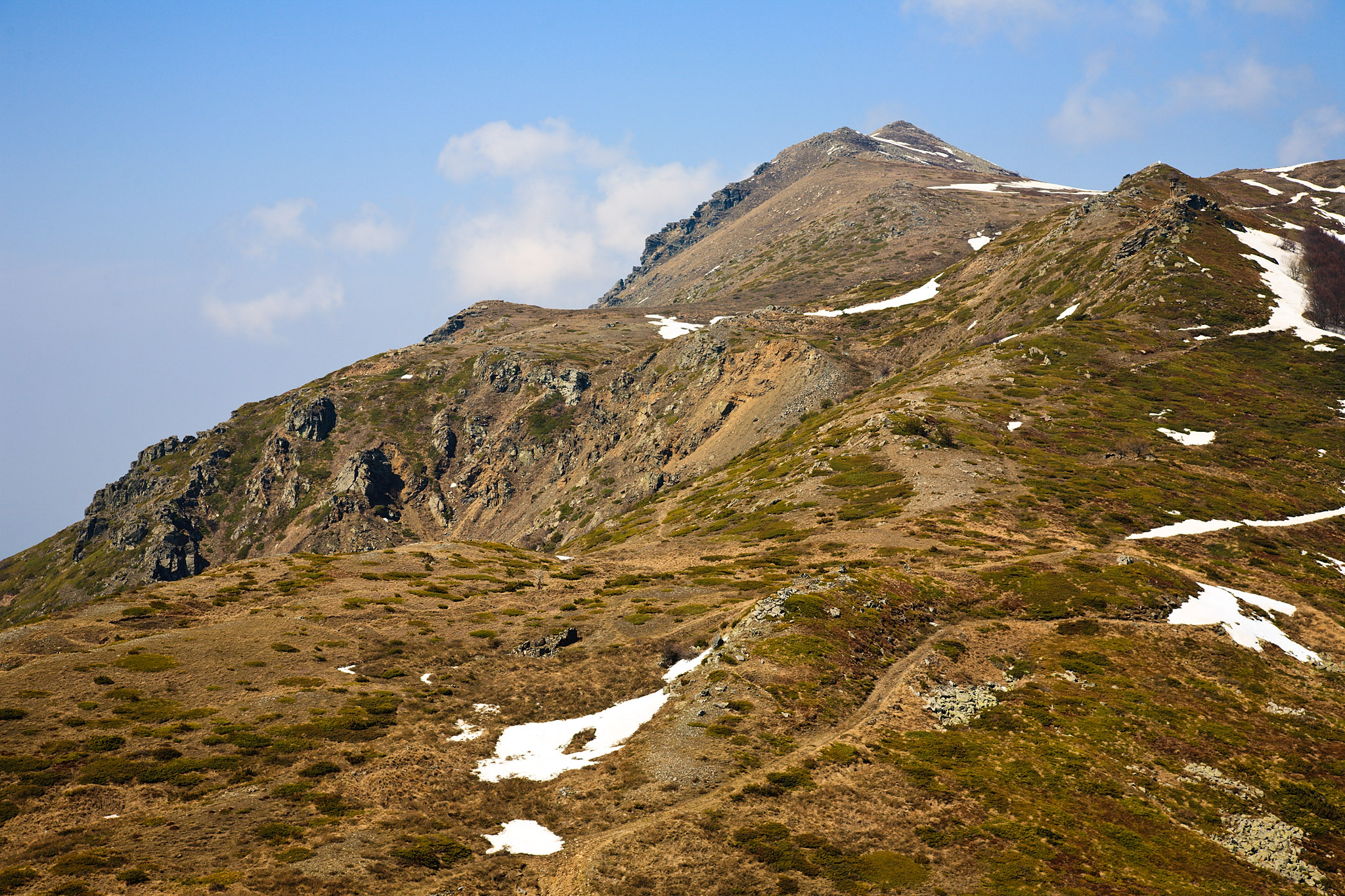
- Tumba Peak

Highest point
- Elevation: 1,880 m (6,170 ft)
- Coordinates: 41°20′17″N 22°56′33″E

Geography
- Location: Bulgaria; Greece; North Macedonia
- Parent range: Belasica

Tumba (Greek: Τούμπα, Bulgarian and Macedonian: Тумба) is a peak in the Belasica mountains in the region of Macedonia. The peak, 1,880 metres (6,170 ft) in height, lies on Belasica's main ridge, west of Lozen Peak and east of Sechena Skala Peak. A dome-shaped mountain with steep southern and northern slopes, Tumba is covered with low subalpine vegetation and is made of metamorphic rock. Tumba is notable as the point where the national borders of Bulgaria, Greece and North Macedonia meet (tripoint). It is one of the southwesternmost point of Bulgaria and one of the southeasternmost point of North Macedonia.

In Bulgaria, favourable starting points of an ascent are the villages Klyuch, Skrat and Gabrene. In North Macedonia, these are Smolari and Sharena Cheshma. In Greece these are Platanakia, Kalochori and Kastanoussa. Every August since 2001, an international excursion to the peak is organized under the motto "Balkans Without Borders".

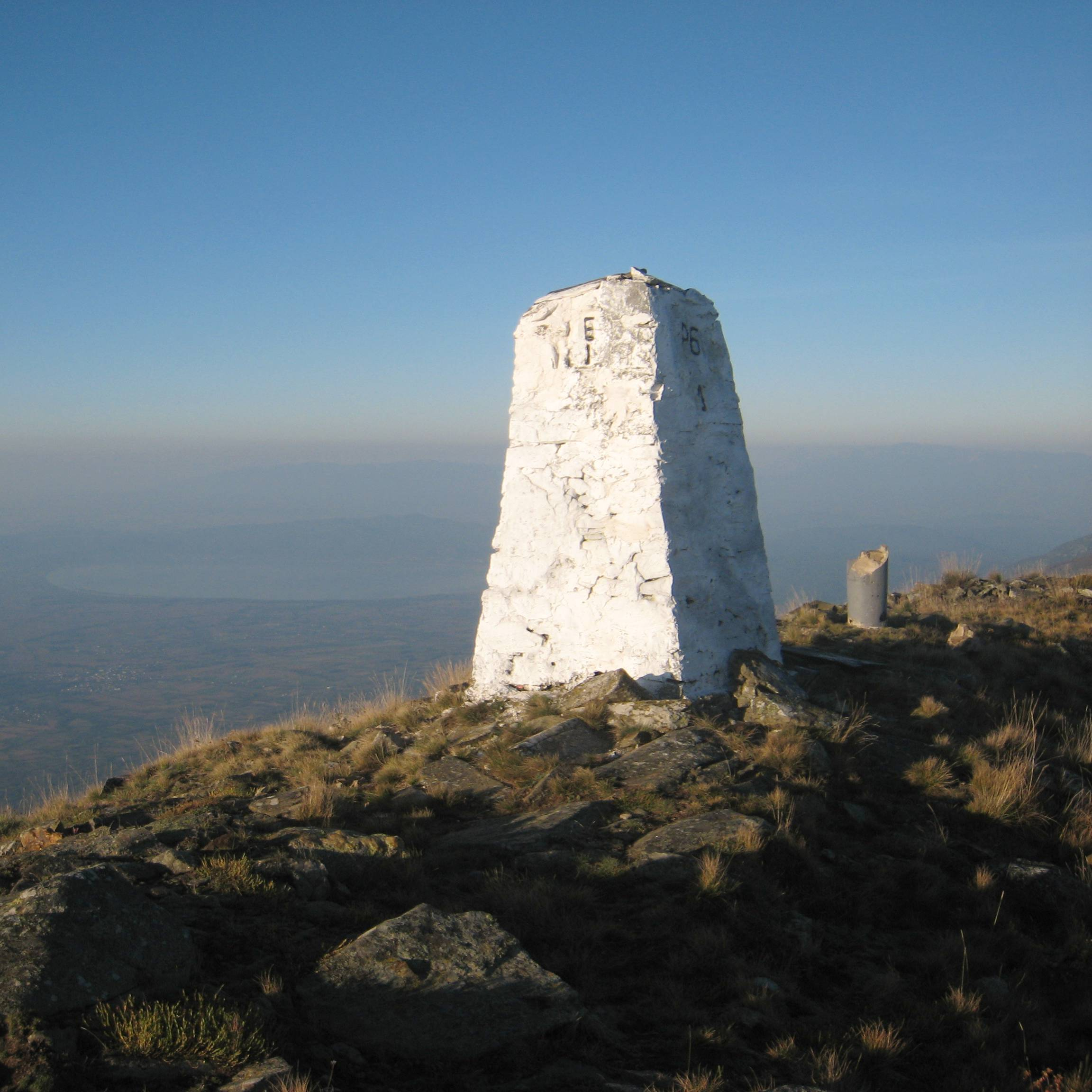
The summit of Tumba, the stone showing 'Ε' for Ελλάδα (Greece) and 'РБ' for Република България (Republic of Bulgaria)
