= Kalochori, Serres =

Kalochori Καλοχώρι
- Settlement
- Location within Greece
- Coordinates: 41°17′03″N 22°55′55″E
- Country: Greece
- Administrative region: Central Macedonia
- Regional unit: Serres
- Municipality: Sintiki
- Municipal unit: Kerkini
- Community: Kastanoussa
- Elevation: 199 m (653 ft)

Population (2021)
  - Total: 127
- Time zone: UTC+2 (EET)
  - Summer (DST): UTC+3 (EEST)
- Postal code: 620 55
- Area code: +30 23270
- Vehicle registration: EP

Kalochori (Greek: Καλοχώρι) (translates as Good Village), known before 1926 as Glaboftsa (Greek: Γκλαμπόφτσα), is a settlement of Central Macedonia in the Serres prefecture. It belongs to the local community of Kastanoussa in the municipality of Sintiki. According to the 2021 census it has a population of 127 inhabitants.

The village is located northwest of the town of Serres about 7 km west of Rodopoli, Serres at the southern foot of Mount Belasitsa in the Belasica mountain range (known also as Kerkini or Beles).

During the First Balkan War the village was under Bulgarian control, but after the Second Balkan War in 1913 it was incorporated within Greece. Greek refugees were resettled in the village during the 1920s. According to the 1928 census, Glaboftsa was a completely refugee village with 49 refugee families with 176 people. In 1926 the village was renamed Kalo Horio, but the new name officially entered the registers in the following 1927.
