= Spano =

- Pronunciation: Italian: [ˈspaːno]
- Language: 1. Logudorese, Campidanese; 2. Neapolitan, Sicilian

Origin
- Languages: 1. Latin; 2. Greek
- Origin: 1. ispanu, spanu 2. spanu
- Derivation: 1. spanus 2. σπανός
- Meaning: 1. 'maroon' 2. 'hairless'

Other names
- Variant forms: Spanò, Spanu

Spano is a surname. Notable people with the surname include:

- Alessandro Spanò, Italian footballer
- Andrew Spano, American politician
- Carlos Spano, Spanish soldier
- Charles A. Spano, Jr., American writer
- Frank Spano, Venezuelan actor
- Giovanni Spano, Sardinian archaeologist and priest
- Joe Spano, American actor
- John Spano, American businessman and convicted fraudster
- Luciano Spano, Mexican painter
- Maxime Spano, French footballer
- Mike Spano, American politician
- Nicholas A. Spano, American politician
- Pippo Spano, Hungarian nobleman
- Róbert Ragnar Spanó, Icelandic/Italian judge
- Robert Spano, American conductor and pianist
- Romain Spano, French footballer
- Ross Spano, American politician
- Vincent Spano, American actor

== Other ==
- Jessie Spano, character on TV series Saved by the Bell
- Spano Island, an Antarctic island
- GTA Spano, Spanish supercar
- Spano v. New York, U.S. Supreme Court case regarding due process

== See also ==
- Spanos (disambiguation)
