= Milochori, Kilkis =

Milochori Μηλοχώρι
- Settlement
- Location within Greece
- Coordinates: 41°06′54.85″N 22°53′49.03″E
- Country: Greece
- Administrative region: Central Macedonia
- Regional unit: Kilkis
- Municipality: Kilkis
- Municipal unit: Kroussa
- Community: Antigoneia
- Elevation: 390 m (1,280 ft)

Population (2021)
  - Total: 48
- Time zone: UTC+2 (EET)
  - Summer (DST): UTC+3 (EEST)
- Postal code: 61 100
- Area code: +30 23410
- Vehicle registration: ΚΙ

Milochori (Greek: Μηλοχώρι) or Mylochori (Greek: Μυλοχώρι) is a mountain village situated in Kilkis, Central Macedonia.

Milochori is located on the southern slopes of Mount Dysoron (part of Kroussia ) at an altitude of 390 meters. The village is 14 km north of the city of Kilkis and 70.5 km north of Thessaloniki. To the east of the village flows the Spanos which ends in the river Gallikos. During the Turkish occupation the village was called Alexia. As a settlement it is officially mentioned in 1928 to be annexed to the then community of Antigoneia, which belonged to the prefecture of Thessaloniki. In 1934 with the Government Gazette 341A-08/10/1934 it was seconded to the newly established prefecture of Kilkis. In 1940 the name was corrected to Milochori. According to the Kallikratis plan of 2010, together with Antigoneia, Gavra and Monolithi, they constitute the local community of Antigoneia, which belongs to the municipal unit of Kroussa within the municipality of Kilkis. According to the 2021 census it has a population of 48 permanent residents.
