= Petros Christou =

Greek chieftain of the Macedonian Struggle

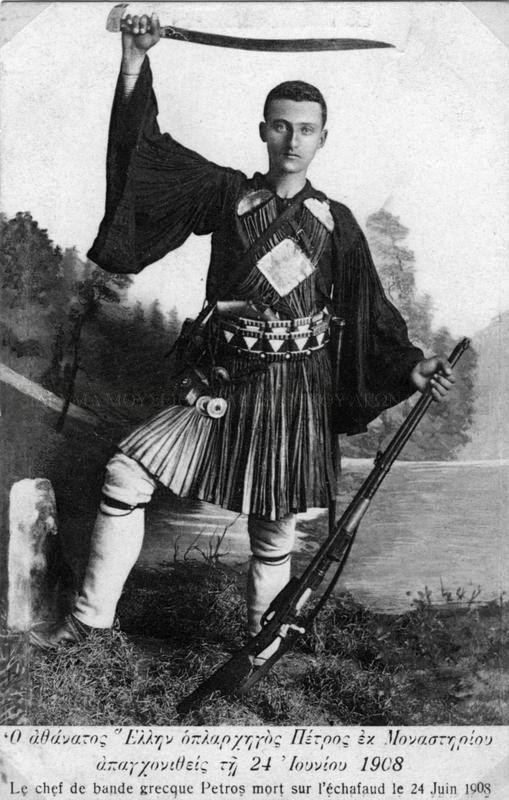
- Petros Christou c. 1906-1908
- Native name: Πέτρος Χρήστου
- Born: c. 1887; Velušina, Monastir Vilayet, Ottoman Empire (now Republic of North Macedonia)
- Died: 21 June 1908 Monastir, Monastir Vilayet, Ottoman Empire (now Bitola, Republic of North Macedonia)
- Allegiance: Kingdom of Greece
- Branch: HMC
- Service years: 1906-1908
- Conflicts: Macedonian Struggle

Petros Christou (Greek: Πέτρος Χρήστου, 1887 - 21 June 1908) was a Slavophone Greek chieftain of the Macedonian Struggle.

== Biography ==
Christou was born in 1887 in Velušina, then Ottoman Empire (now Republic of North Macedonia). He served as a teacher in Gradešnica. Later, he joined the armed group of Cretan G. Volanis, where he was distinguished for his leadership abilities. He also collaborated with G. Dikonomos Makris. In May 1906 he formed his own armed group that acted in Mariovo against the Bulgarian komitadjis and Ottoman military detachments, cooperating with the chieftain Simos Ioannidis.

Later, he collaborated with Georgios Tsontos, acting in southern Mariovo and in the region of Florina and Prespa. At the end of May 1907, due to the departure of Tsontos and a number of chieftains towards Korestia, Christou, with his group, united with the group of G. Proimos, acting in all the areas of Prespa, Florina and southern Mariovo and Pelister. Then he moved south to Verno, where he cooperated with the chieftains I. Karavitis, Pavlos Rakovitis, S. Kleidis and P. Gerogiannis.

In April 1907, along with the groups of chieftains Pavlos Nikolaidis, G. Tsontos and I. Karavitis, attacked komitadjis in Florina. Many young local people rushed then to be ranked among the armed groups of those chieftains. At the end of 1907 he took over the defense in the area of the villages of Kabasnitsa (now Proti) and Kladorrachi of Florina. In May 1908, after a clash with an Ottoman army detachment, southwest of Monastir (now Bitola), he escaped to Bukovo, where he was finally arrested. He was hanged on 21 June 1908, in Monastir, as a retaliation for the assassination of Deputy Governor Zeinel Bey of Nymfaio. In 1960 a bust was erected on a central street in Florina to honor him.
