= Anatoli, Serres =

Anatoli Ανατολή
- Community
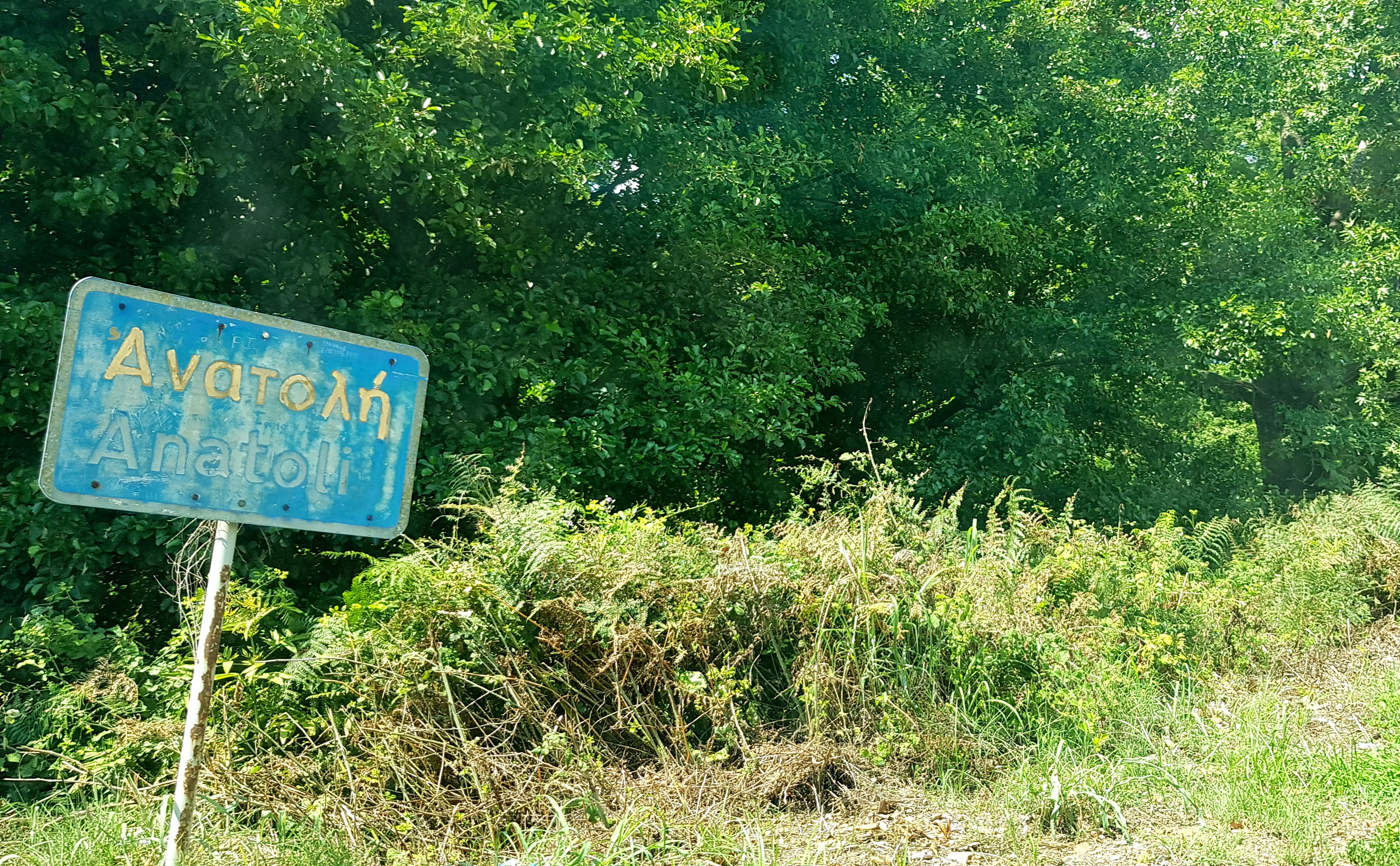
- Anatoli village sign

- Location within Greece
- Coordinates: 41°15′45″N 22°55′49″E
- Country: Greece
- Administrative region: Central Macedonia
- Regional unit: Serres
- Municipality: Sintiki
- Municipal unit: Kerkini
- Elevation: 140 m (460 ft)

Population (2021)
  - Community: 252
- Time zone: UTC+2 (EET)
  - Summer (DST): UTC+3 (EEST)
- Postal code: 620 53
- Area code: +30 23270
- Vehicle registration: EP

Anatoli (Greek: Ανατολή) is a village and a community in the municipality of Sintiki, within the regional section of Serres, at the border with the neighbouring regional section of Kilkis. It was known as Anatolou (Ανατολού) prior to 1927. As a result of the Kallikratis plan of 2010, it belongs to the municipality of Sintiki. Prior to this date, it had been in the municipality of Kerkini. According to the 2021 census, it has a population of 252 inhabitants, the majority of whom have roots in the Greek diaspora who came from areas of Pontus. According to the 1928 census, Anatolia is a purely refugee village with 31 refugee families of 108 people.

A small river flows from the entrance of the village. The existing school is no longer operating. The Central Church of the village is dedicated to the Prophet Elias.

The village is famous for its beautiful square with tall plane trees. Also near the village there is a chapel dedicated to Saint Paisios of Mount Athos.

The village is located in the Serres Plain (Ο κάμπος των Σερρών) about 55 kilometers northwest of the town of Serres, northwest of Lake Kerkini.
