= Doller (river) =

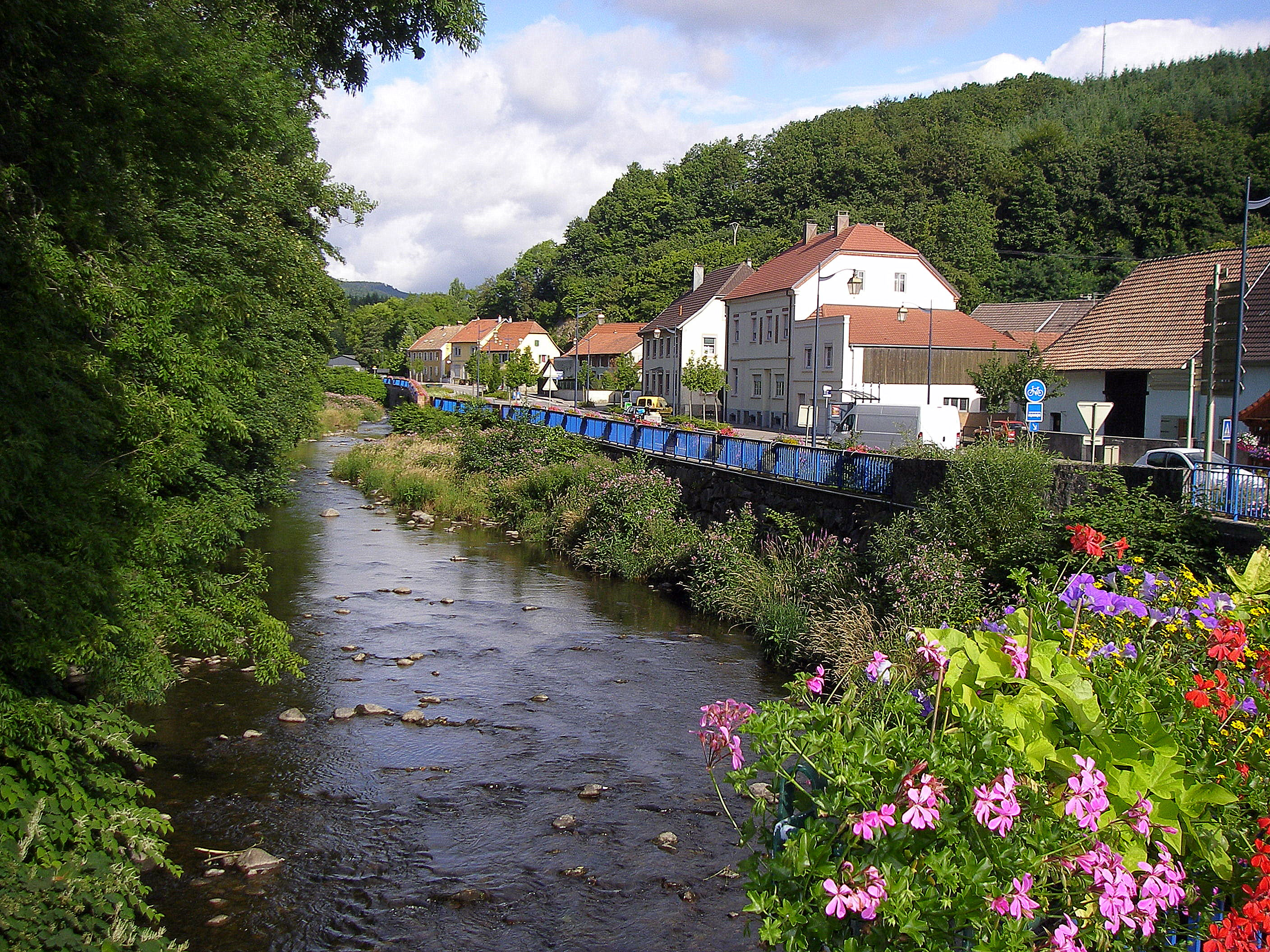

- Location within France Location within Grand Est

Location
- Country: France

Physical characteristics
- Source
  - location: Vosges Mountains
  - elevation: 940 m (3,080 ft)
- Mouth
  - location: Ill
  - coordinates: 47°45′56″N 7°19′51″E
- Length: 46 km (29 mi)

Basin features
- Progression: Ill→ Rhine→ North Sea

The Doller (French pronunciation: [dɔlɛʁ]) is a river in Alsace (Haut-Rhin), in north-eastern France. It is a left tributary of the Ill (a tributary of the Rhine), in Mulhouse. It is 46.5 km (28.9 mi) long.

The source of the Doller is in the Vosges Mountains, east of the Ballon d'Alsace, at 940 metres (3,080 ft) elevation. It flows generally east, through the towns Sewen, Dolleren, Masevaux, Sentheim, Reiningue, before it enters the Ill in Mulhouse.
