= Spano Island =

Island in Antarctica

Spano Island (66°24′S 110°36′E) is a small rocky island 0.5 nautical miles (0.9 km) north of the west end of Herring Island, in the Windmill Islands. First mapped from air photos taken by U.S. Navy Operation Highjump and Operation Windmill in 1947 and 1948. Named by the Advisory Committee on Antarctic Names (US-ACAN) for Angelo F. Spano, meteorologist and member of the Wilkes Station party of 1960.

== See also ==
- List of antarctic and sub-antarctic islands
