= Spanos =

Spanos is a surname of Greek origin. Notable people with the surname include:

- Alex Spanos (1923–2018), American owner of the San Diego Chargers
- Anthony Spanos (born 1995), Australian actor
- Danny Spanos, American musician
- Dean Spanos (born 1950), American chairman and owner of the Los Angeles Chargers
- Giannis Spanos (1934–2019), Greek musician
- John Spanos (born 1961), Australian soccer player
- Lou Spanos (born 1971), American football coach
- Matt Spanos (born 1984), American football player
- Nicholas Spanos (1942–1994), American/Canadian psychology professor
- Peter Spanos, American politician
- Nick Spanos (died 1990), Australian murder victim
- Vasili Spanos (born 1981), American baseball player
- William V. Spanos (1924–2017), American literature

== See also ==
- Spano (disambiguation)
