= Kastanoussa =

Kastanoussa Καστανούσσα
- Community
- Location within Greece
- Coordinates: 41.27361°N 22.8925°E
- Country: Greece
- Administrative region: Central Macedonia
- Regional unit: Serres
- Municipality: Sintiki
- Municipal unit: Kerkini
- Elevation: 274 m (899 ft)

Population (2021)
  - Community: 635
- Time zone: UTC+2 (EET)
  - Summer (DST): UTC+3 (EEST)
- Postal code: 620 55
- Area code: +30 23270
- Vehicle registration: EP

Kastanoussa (Greek: Καστανούσσα, Bulgarian: Палмеш), known before 1926 as Palmes (Greek: Πάλμες), is a village and a community in Serres with a population of 635 inhabitants as recorded in the 2021 census. The village and community belongs to the municipality of Sintiki.

== Geography ==
The village is located in the southern foothills of Belasitsa, near the borders with North Macedonia and Bulgaria.

== History ==
=== In the Ottoman Empire ===
In 1891 Georgi Strezov wrote:

Palmesh, several neighbourhoods on the west of Poroy [modern name of Ano Poroia], 6 hours drive at the foot of Belasitsa and Pear mountain. Approximately 200 houses, all Pomaks. They speak Bulgarian with a slight difference from Poroy; they dress in a special red garment-anther and poturi. They come to the market in Poroy with fish from Doiran Lake.

According to the statistics of Vasil Kanchov ("Macedonia. Ethnography and Statistics") by 1900 "Palmesh" ("Palmesha") is a Bulgarian Muslims' settlement . 1150 Bulgarian Muslims were living there at the time.

=== Under Greek sovereignty ===
During the First Balkan War the village was under Bulgarian control, but after the Second Balkan War in 1913 it was incorporated within Greece.

== Bibliography ==
- Kanchov, Vasil (1996) [1900]. Makedonija : etnografija i statistika [Macedonia: Ethnography and statistics] (in Bulgarian). Sofia: Bulgarian Academy of Sciences. ISBN 978-9-54-430424-9. OCLC 164844115.
- Stresov, Georgi (1891). Два санджака отъ Источна Македония [Two sanjaks from Eastern Macedonia] (PDF) (in Bulgarian). Sofia: Dŭrzhavna pechatnitsa.
