= Platanakia, Serres =

Platanakia Πλατανάκια
- Community
- Location within the regional unit

- Location within Greece
- Coordinates: 41.2869°N 22.9469°E
- Country: Greece
- Administrative region: Central Macedonia
- Regional unit: Serres
- Municipality: Sintiki
- Municipal unit: Kerkini
- Elevation: 172 m (564 ft)

Population (2021)
  - Community: 411
- Time zone: UTC+2 (EET)
  - Summer (DST): UTC+3 (EEST)
- Postal code: 620 55
- Area code: +30 23270
- Vehicle registration: EP

Platanakia (Greek: Πλατανάκια, Bulgarian: Шугово) known before 1922 as Sugova / Shugovo (Greek: Σιούγκοβα) is a village in Serres, Greece. It is situated in the municipal unit of Kerkini, in the Sintiki municipality, within the Serres region of Central Macedonia. The village had 411 inhabitants according to the 2021 census.

== Geography ==
The village is located in the southern foothills of Belasitsa, near the tripoint with Bulgaria and North Macedonia.

== History ==
=== In the Ottoman Empire ===
In the Ottoman tax summary list of non-Muslim population of the province Timur Hisara from 1616-1617 year the village of Shugova is noted as having 133 households that are liable for jizya charcoal tax.

In the XIX century Shugovo is a village within the Demirhisar Kaza of the Sanjak of Serres in the Ottoman Empire. In " Ethnography of the Provinces of Adrianople, Monastir and Thessaloniki ", published in Constantinople in 1878 and reflecting the statistics of the male population from 1873, Shugovo (Chougovo) is listed as a village with 250 households and 300 Muslims and 340 Bulgarians .

In 1891 Georgi Strezov wrote:

Shugovo, to Z. from Poroy [modern name of Ano Poroia] for about two hours. Location and classes the same as in Makrinitsa. They have a church and a school with 20 students in which they read Greek. 30 houses of Turks and 60 Bulgarians.

According to the statistics of Vasil Kanchov ("Macedonia. Ethnography and Statistics") by 1900 the village was inhabited 850 Bulgarian Christians and 500 Turks.

The entire population of the village is under the rule of the Bulgarian Exarchate. According to the secretary of the Exarchate Dimitar Mishev ( " La Macédoine et sa Population Chrétienne ") in 1905 the population of Shugovo (Chougovo) is 1800. Bulgarians Exarchists in Bulgarian village operates a primary school with one teacher and 41 students.

At the outbreak of the Balkan War in 1912, twenty-seven people from Shugovo volunteered for the Macedonian-Edirne militia.

=== Under Greek sovereignty ===
During the First Balkan War the village was under Bulgarian control, but after the Second Balkan War in 1913 it was incorporated within Greece. Greek refugees are settled in the village. According to the 1928 census, Sugovo is a mixed local refugee village with 254 refugee families with 876 people. In 1922, the name of the village was changed to Platanakia.

== Bibliography ==
- Brankoff, DM [in Bulgarian] (2018) [1905]. La Macedoine et sa Population Chrétienne: Avec deux cartes ethnographiques [Macedonia and its Christian Population] (PDF) (in French). Paris: Librarie Plon, Plon-Nourrit et Cie. ISBN 978-0-36-624171-2. OCLC 581594143.
- Dminitrov, Strašimir; et al., eds. (1986). Турски извори за българската история [Turkish sources on Bulgarian history. Volume 7] (in Bulgarian) (1st ed.). Sofia: BAN. OCLC 762368420.
- Jordanov, Jordan Iliev, ed. (1995). Македония и Одринско статистика на населението от 1873 [Macedonia and the Edirne: Population Statistics from 1873]. Makedonska biblioteka (in Bulgarian) (1st ed.). Sofia: Македонски научен институт. ISBN 978-9-54-818721-3.
- Kanchov, Vasil (1996) [1900]. Makedonija : etnografija i statistika [Macedonia: Ethnography and statistics] (in Bulgarian). Sofia: Bulgarian Academy of Sciences. ISBN 978-9-54-430424-9. OCLC 164844115.
- Kusev, Metodiy; Gruev, Georg; et al. (1878). Ethnographie des Vilayets d'Andrinople, de Monastir et de Salonique [Ethnography of the provinces of Adrianople, Monastir and Thessaloniki] (in French). Istanbul: Courrier d'Orient. OCLC 769699229.
- Македоно-одринското опълчение, 1912-1913 : личен състав по документи на Дирекция "Централен военен архив" [Macedonian-Edirne Militia 1912-1913: Personnel according to documents of the Central Military Archives Directorate] (PDF). primary source documents Arkhivni spravochnit︠s︡i (in Bulgarian). Sofia: Главно управление на архивите при Министерския съвет. 2007. ISBN 978-9-54-980052-4.
- Sinvet, Alexandre (1878). Les Grecs de l'Empire Ottoman. Etude Statistique et Ethnographique [The Greeks of the Ottoman Empire. A Statistical and Ethnographic Study] (in French) (2nd ed.). Istanbul: l'Orient Illustré. OCLC 252032470.
- Stresov, Georgi (1891). Два санджака отъ Источна Македония [Two sanjaks from Eastern Macedonia] (PDF) (in Bulgarian). Sofia: Dŭrzhavna pechatnitsa.
