= Nikoliḱ =

Nikoliḱ Николиќ
- Village
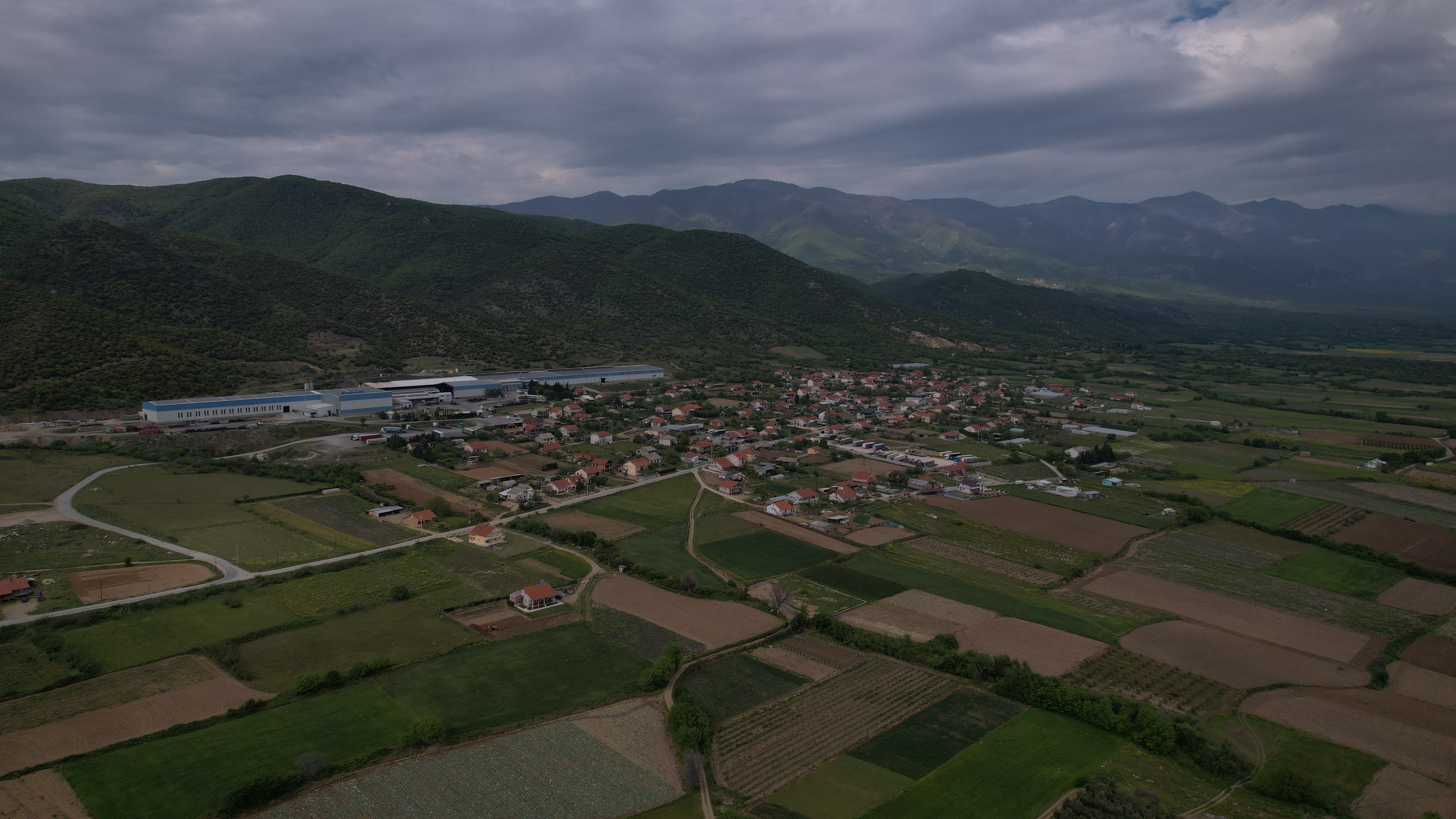
- Air view of the village

- Location within North Macedonia
- Coordinates: 41.261894°N 22.745956°E
- Country: North Macedonia
- Region: Southeastern
- Municipality: Dojran

Population (2002)
  - Total: 541
- Time zone: UTC+1 (CET)
  - Summer (DST): UTC+2 (CEST)
- Website: .

Nikoliḱ (Macedonian: Николиќ) is a village in the municipality of Dojran, North Macedonia. It is located north of Doiran Lake, near the Greek border.

== Demographics ==
According to the 2002 census, the village had a total of 541 inhabitants. Ethnic groups in the village include:

- Macedonians 527
- Serbs 13
- Others 1
