= Burnhaupt-le-Bas =

Commune in Grand Est, France

- Commune
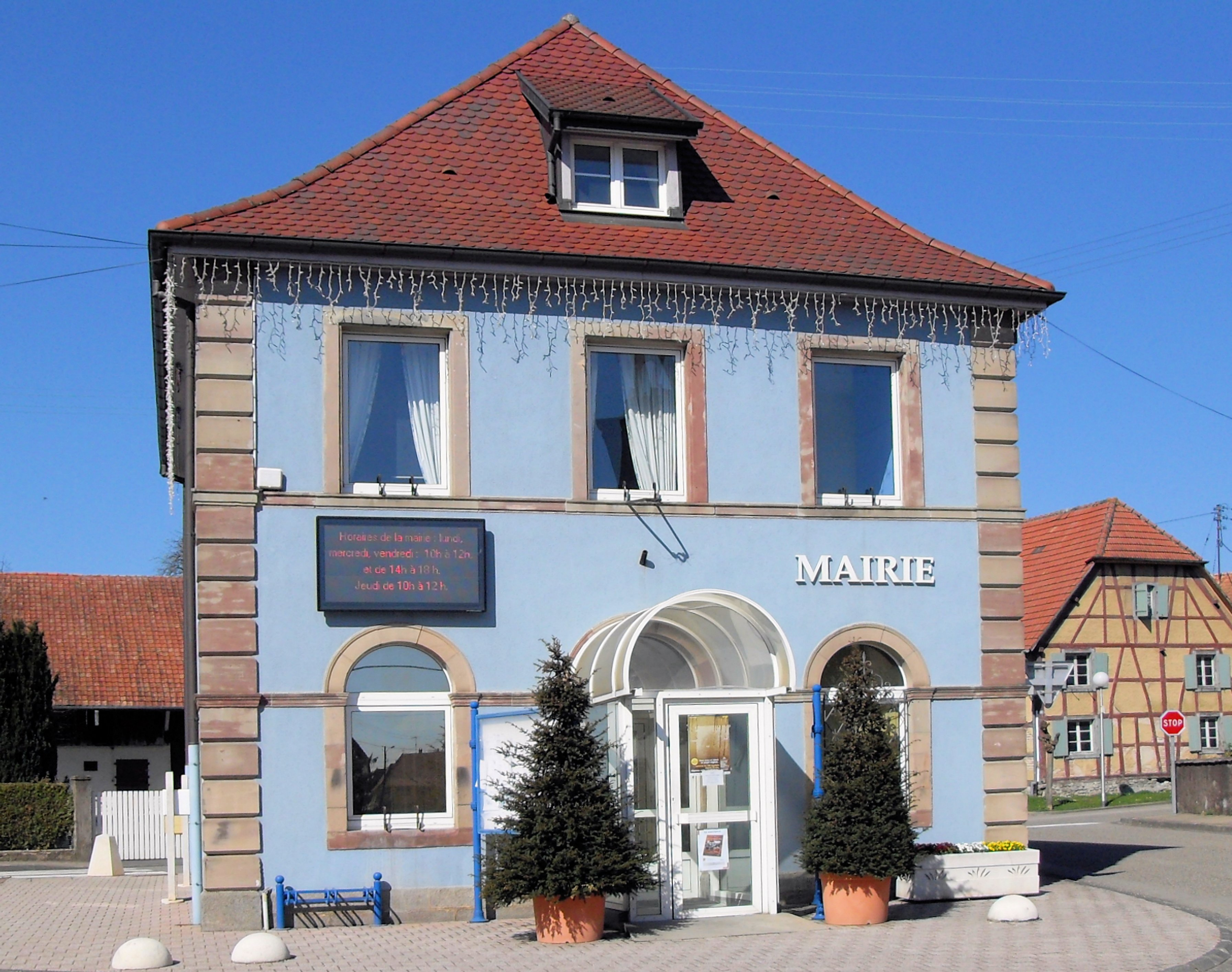
- The town hall in Burnhaupt-le-Bas

- Coat of arms
- Location of Burnhaupt-le-Bas
- Location within France Location within Grand Est
- Coordinates: 47°43′07″N 7°09′45″E
- Country: France
- Region: Grand Est
- Department: Haut-Rhin
- Arrondissement: Thann-Guebwiller
- Canton: Masevaux-Niederbruck
- Intercommunality: Vallée de la Doller et du Soultzbach

Government
  - Mayor (2020–2026): Alain Grieneisen
- Area^{1}: 11.77 km^{2} (4.54 sq mi)
- Elevation: 300 m (980 ft)
- Highest elevation: 330 m (1,080 ft)
- Lowest elevation: 279 m (915 ft)
- Population (2023): 1,969
  - Density: 167.3/km^{2} (433.3/sq mi)
- Time zone: UTC+01:00 (CET)
  - Summer (DST): UTC+02:00 (CEST)
- INSEE/Postal code: 68059 /68520
- Website: http://burnhaupt.free.fr
- ^{1} French Land Register data, which excludes lakes, ponds, glaciers > 1 km^{2} (0.386 sq mi or 247 acres) and river estuaries.

Burnhaupt-le-Bas (French pronunciation: [byʁnopt lə ba]; German: Niederburnhaupt; both lit. 'Lower Burnhaupt', in contrast to "Upper Burnhaupt") is a commune in the Haut-Rhin department in Grand Est in north-eastern France.

== See also ==
- Communes of the Haut-Rhin department
