= Velušina =

Velušina Велушина Vellushinë
- Village
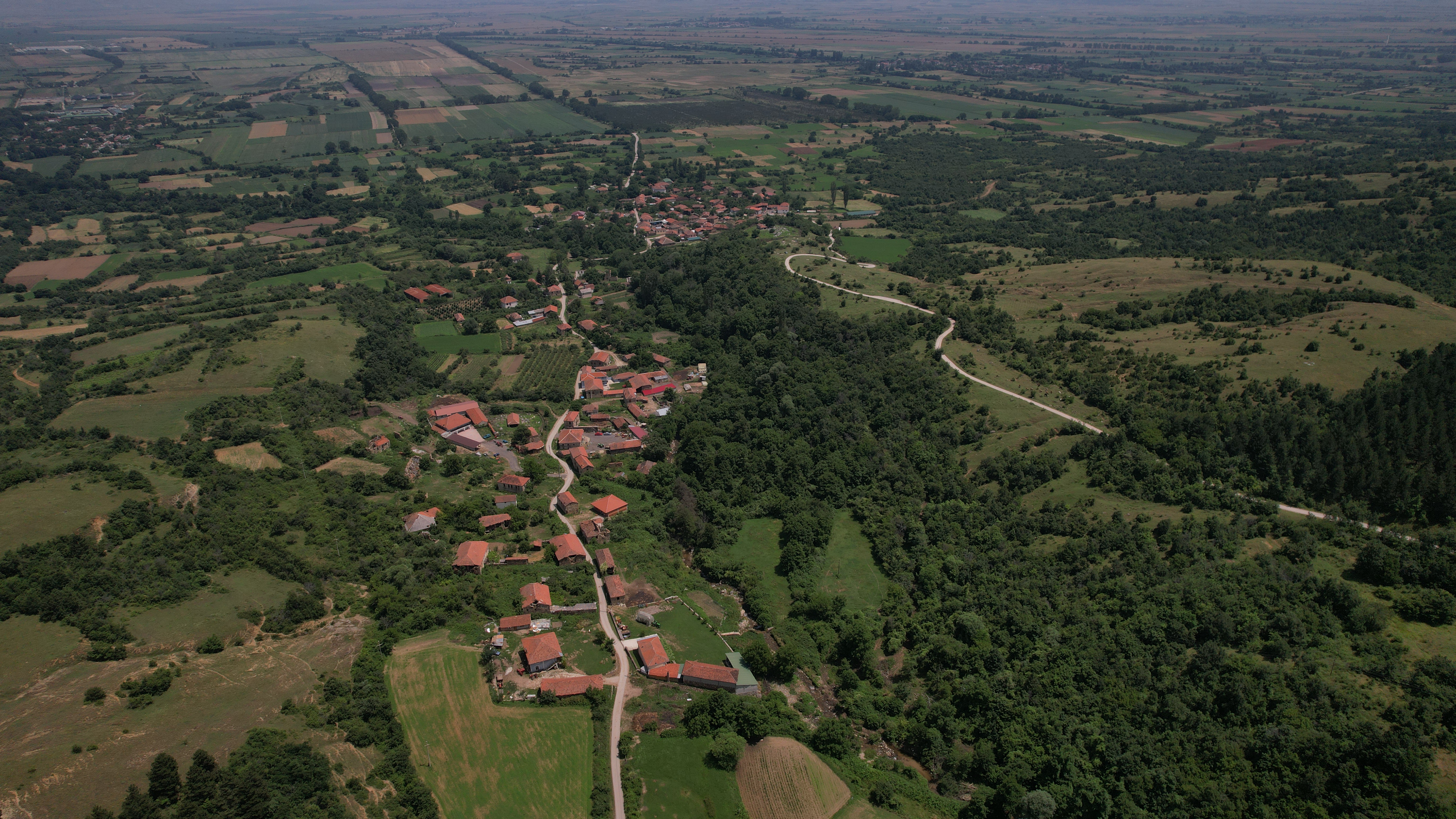
- Air view of the village

- Location within North Macedonia
- Coordinates: 40°55′N 21°21′E
- Country: North Macedonia
- Region: Pelagonia
- Municipality: Bitola

Population (2002)
  - Total: 160
- Time zone: UTC+1 (CET)
  - Summer (DST): UTC+2 (CEST)
- Car plates: BT
- Website: .

Velušina (Macedonian: Велушина, Albanian: Vellushinë) is a village in the municipality of Bitola, North Macedonia. It used to be part of the former municipality of Bistrica.

Velušina is located 15 kilometers south of Bitola (Битола) on route R2333 (about six kilometers north of the border with Greece) at the foot of Mount Baba in the Pelagonija (Пелагонија) Valley. The Velushka River (Велушка Река) flows through the village.

== Name ==
Etymologically the name of the village originates from the local Slavic phrase Velika Elyeusa (велика Елеуса – Велеушина), referring to the main village Church of the Holy Mother of God (Богородица Елеуса, Bogoroditsa Elyeusa) which is situated in the village. It is a similar situation to Veljusa's (Вељуса), near Strumica, where the church of the Most-Holy Merciful Theotokos is located.

The church of the Merciful Theotokos in Velušina is dedicated to the Dormition of the Mother of God, it is a paleochristian basilica built on the 4th-5th century, during the reign of the Byzantine Emperor Theodosius II. It is situated in the southeastern part Velušina near the ancient Via Egnatia and the old road from Kastoria to Irakleia. Today it is known by the local population as the "old church".

== Demographics ==
Velušina is attested in the Ottoman defter of 1467/68 as a village in the vilayet of Manastir. The inhabitants attested predominantly bore typical Slavic anthroponyms, with a significant minority bearing Albanian anthroponyms, such as Gjin, Gjon, Gjergj etc.

In statistics gathered by Vasil Kanchov in 1900, the village of Velušina was inhabited by 920 Christian Bulgarians. In 1905 in statistics gathered by Dimitar Mishev Brancoff, Velušina was inhabited by 880 “Grecomans” who followed the Bulgarian Patriarchate and had a Greek school with 20 students. According to the 2002 census, the village had a total of 160 inhabitants. Ethnic groups in the village include:

- Albanians 79
- Macedonians 73
- Romani 5
- Serbs 3

As of the 2021 census, Velušina had 165 residents with the following ethnic composition:

- Albanians 109
- Macedonians 37
- Persons for whom data are taken from administrative sources 11
- Romani 7
- Others 1

== Notable people ==
- Petros Christou (1887 - 1908), Greek teacher and chieftain of the Macedonian Struggle
