= Burnhaupt-le-Haut =

Commune in Grand Est, France

Burnhaupt-le-Haut Ewer-Burnhàuipt
- Commune
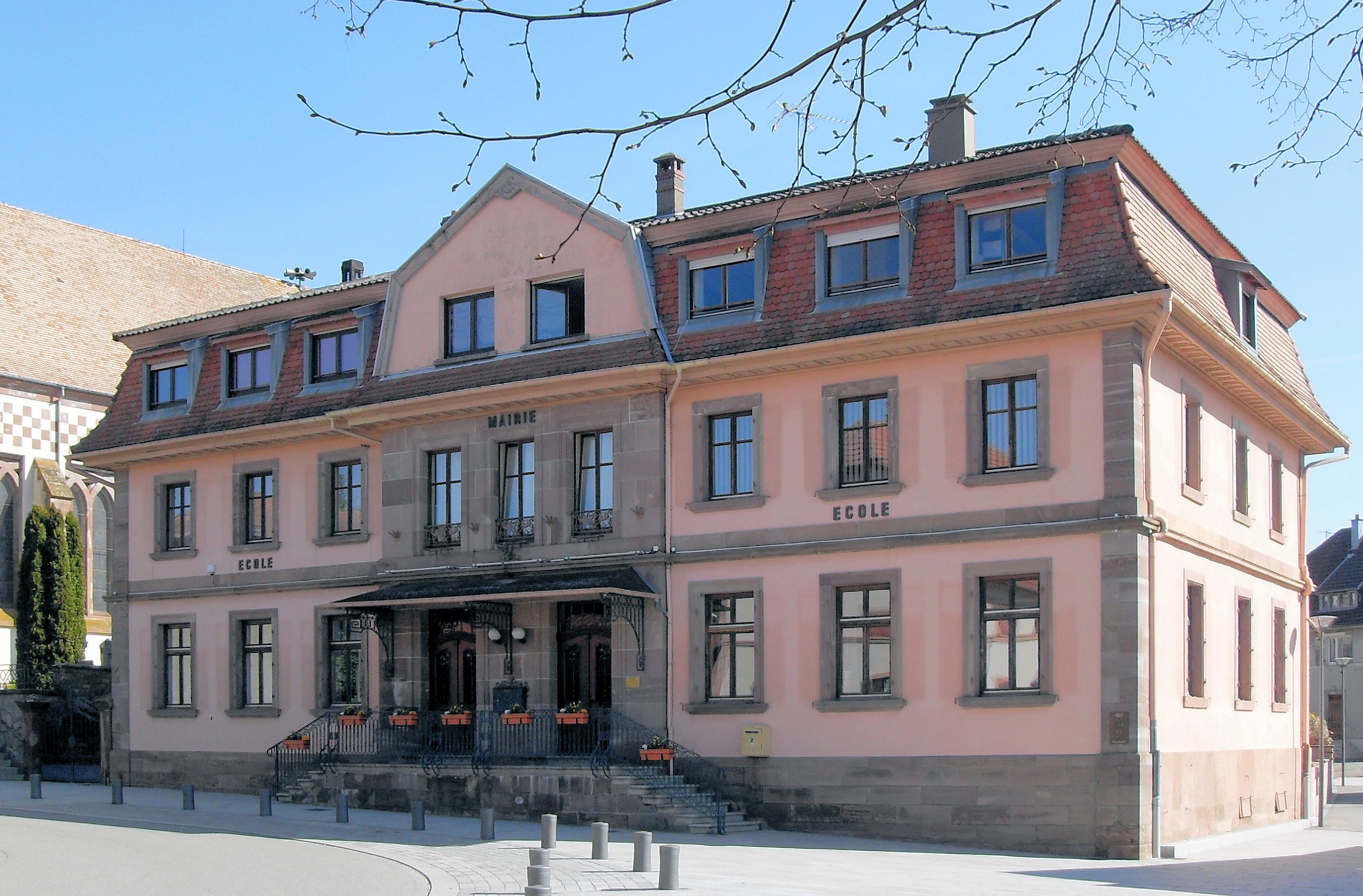
- The town hall and school in Burnhaupt-le-Haut

- Coat of arms
- Location of Burnhaupt-le-Haut
- Location within France Location within Grand Est
- Coordinates: 47°43′51″N 7°08′46″E
- Country: France
- Region: Grand Est
- Department: Haut-Rhin
- Arrondissement: Thann-Guebwiller
- Canton: Masevaux-Niederbruck
- Intercommunality: Vallée de la Doller et du Soultzbach

Government
  - Mayor (2020–2026): Véronique Sengler-Waltz
- Area^{1}: 12.49 km^{2} (4.82 sq mi)
- Elevation: 300 m (980 ft)
- Highest elevation: 338 m (1,109 ft)
- Lowest elevation: 290 m (950 ft)
- Population (2023): 1,793
  - Density: 143.6/km^{2} (371.8/sq mi)
- Time zone: UTC+01:00 (CET)
  - Summer (DST): UTC+02:00 (CEST)
- INSEE/Postal code: 68060 /68520
- Website: www.burnhaupt-le-haut.fr
- ^{1} French Land Register data, which excludes lakes, ponds, glaciers > 1 km^{2} (0.386 sq mi or 247 acres) and river estuaries.

Burnhaupt-le-Haut (French pronunciation: [byʁnopt lə o]; German: Oberburnhaupt; both lit. 'Upper Burnhaupt', in contrast to "Lower Burnhaupt") is a commune in the Haut-Rhin department in Grand Est in north-eastern France.

== See also ==
- Communes of the Haut-Rhin department
