= Sentheim =

Commune in Grand Est, France

- Commune
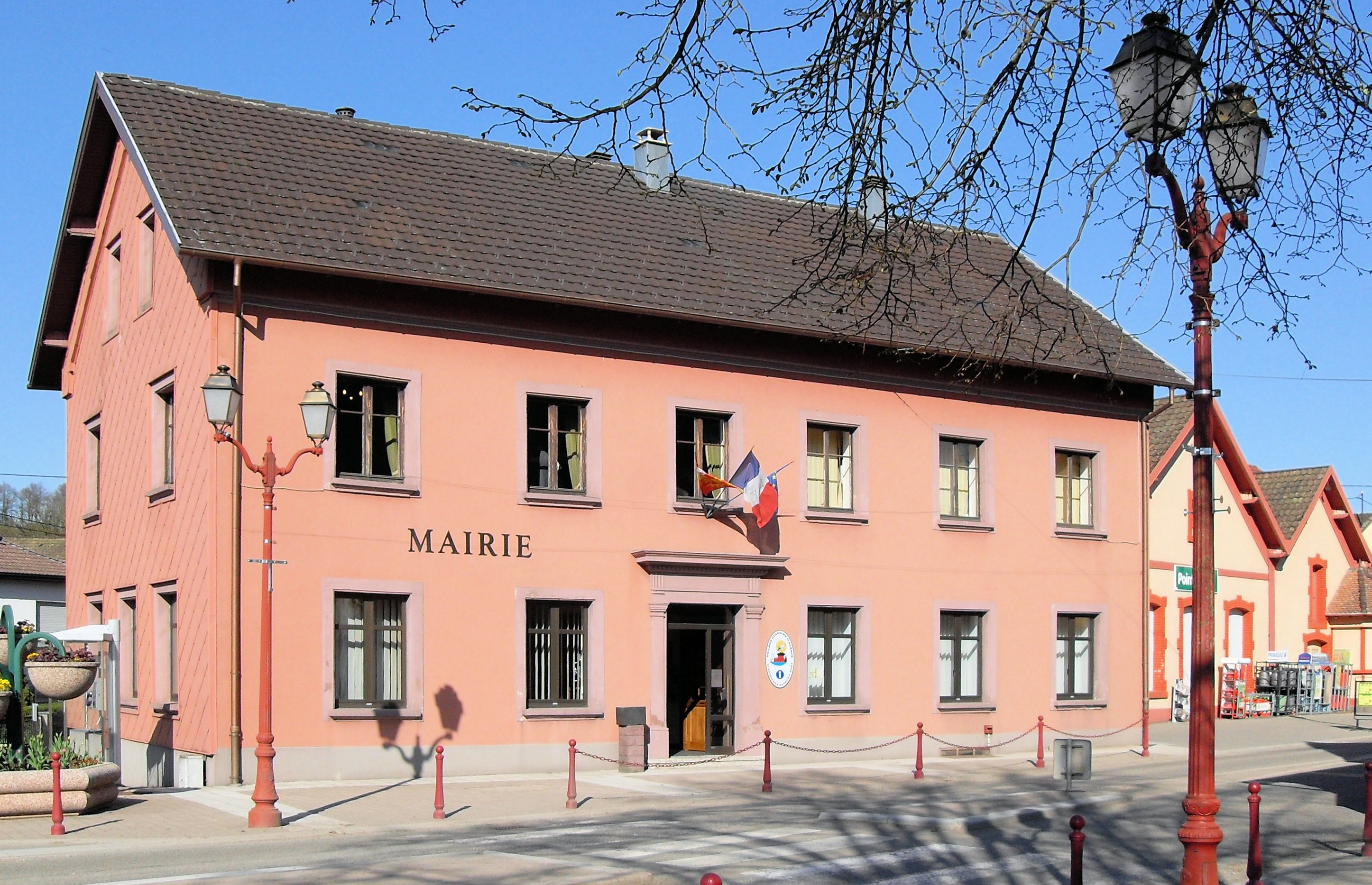
- The town hall in Sentheim

- Coat of arms
- Location of Sentheim
- Location within France Location within Grand Est
- Coordinates: 47°45′20″N 7°03′06″E
- Country: France
- Region: Grand Est
- Department: Haut-Rhin
- Arrondissement: Thann-Guebwiller
- Canton: Masevaux-Niederbruck
- Intercommunality: Vallée de la Doller et du Soultzbach

Government
  - Mayor (2020–2026): Bernard Hirth
- Area^{1}: 6.18 km^{2} (2.39 sq mi)
- Elevation: 360 m (1,180 ft)
- Highest elevation: 456 m (1,496 ft)
- Lowest elevation: 343 m (1,125 ft)
- Population (2023): 1,528
  - Density: 247/km^{2} (640/sq mi)
- Time zone: UTC+01:00 (CET)
  - Summer (DST): UTC+02:00 (CEST)
- INSEE/Postal code: 68304 /68780
- ^{1} French Land Register data, which excludes lakes, ponds, glaciers > 1 km^{2} (0.386 sq mi or 247 acres) and river estuaries.

Sentheim (French pronunciation: [sɛntaim]) is a commune in the Haut-Rhin department in Grand Est in north-eastern France.

== See also ==
- Communes of the Haut-Rhin department
