= Sewen =

Commune in Grand Est, France

- Commune
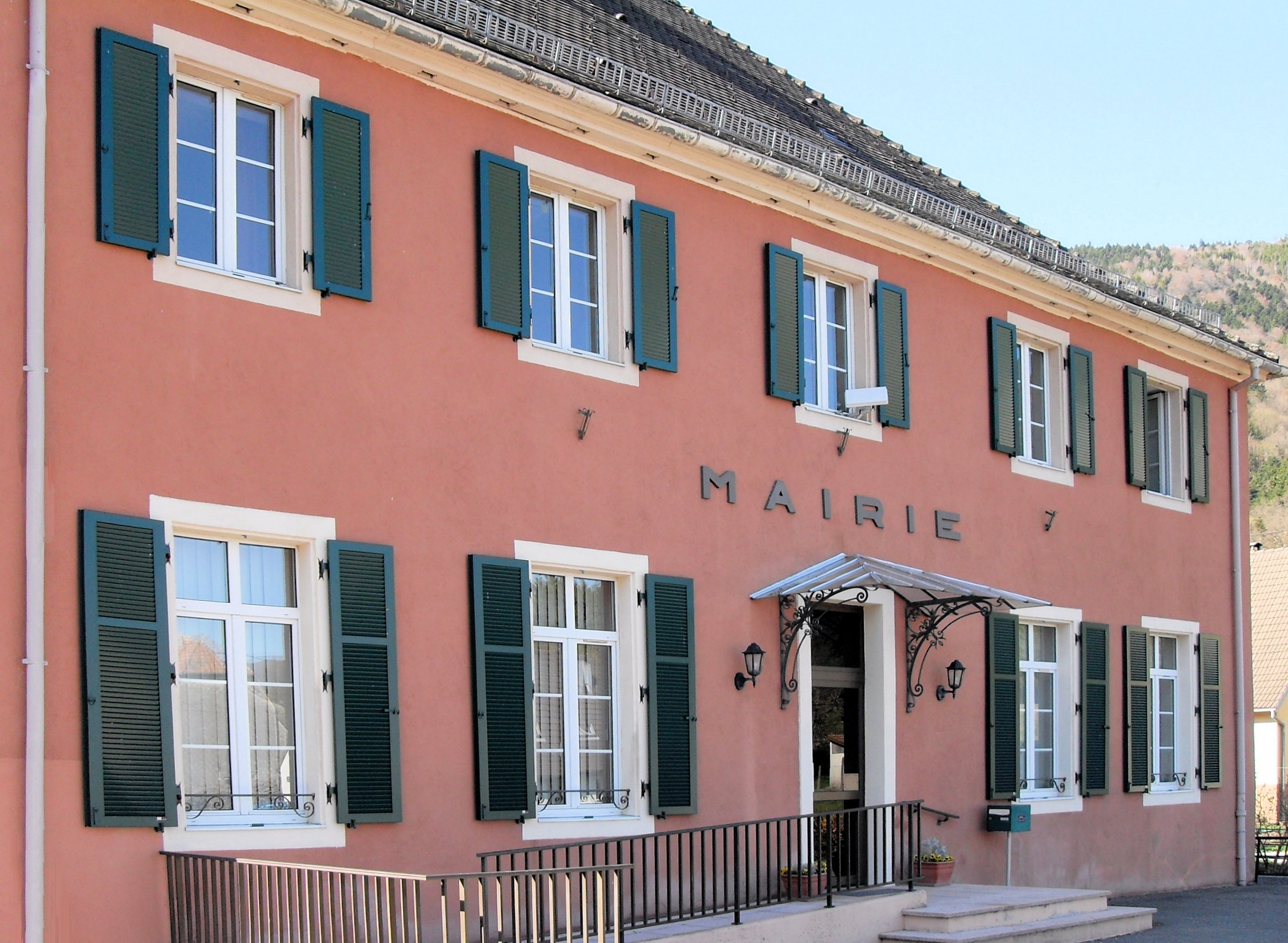
- The town hall in Sewen

- Coat of arms
- Location of Sewen
- Location within France Location within Grand Est
- Coordinates: 47°48′29″N 6°54′20″E
- Country: France
- Region: Grand Est
- Department: Haut-Rhin
- Arrondissement: Thann-Guebwiller
- Canton: Masevaux-Niederbruck
- Intercommunality: Vallée de la Doller et du Soultzbach

Government
  - Mayor (2020–2026): Hubert Fluhr
- Area^{1}: 21.5 km^{2} (8.3 sq mi)
- Elevation: 500 m (1,600 ft)
- Highest elevation: 1,242 m (4,075 ft)
- Lowest elevation: 483 m (1,585 ft)
- Population (2023): 480
  - Density: 22/km^{2} (58/sq mi)
- Time zone: UTC+01:00 (CET)
  - Summer (DST): UTC+02:00 (CEST)
- INSEE/Postal code: 68307 /68290
- ^{1} French Land Register data, which excludes lakes, ponds, glaciers > 1 km^{2} (0.386 sq mi or 247 acres) and river estuaries.

Sewen (French pronunciation: [sevœn]; Alsatian: Seewe) is a commune in the Haut-Rhin department in Grand Est in north-eastern France.

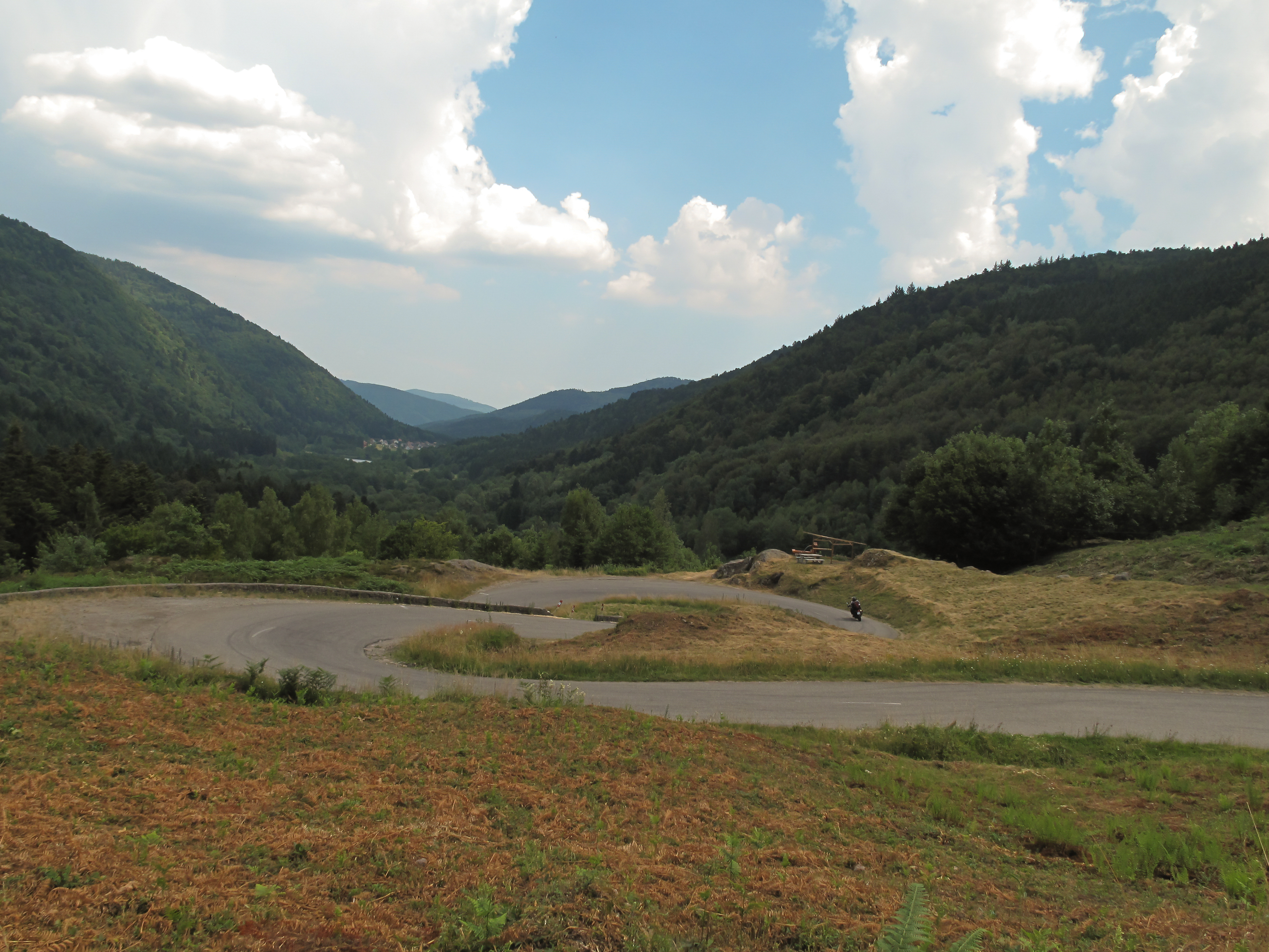
between Sewen and La Gentiane, road panorama

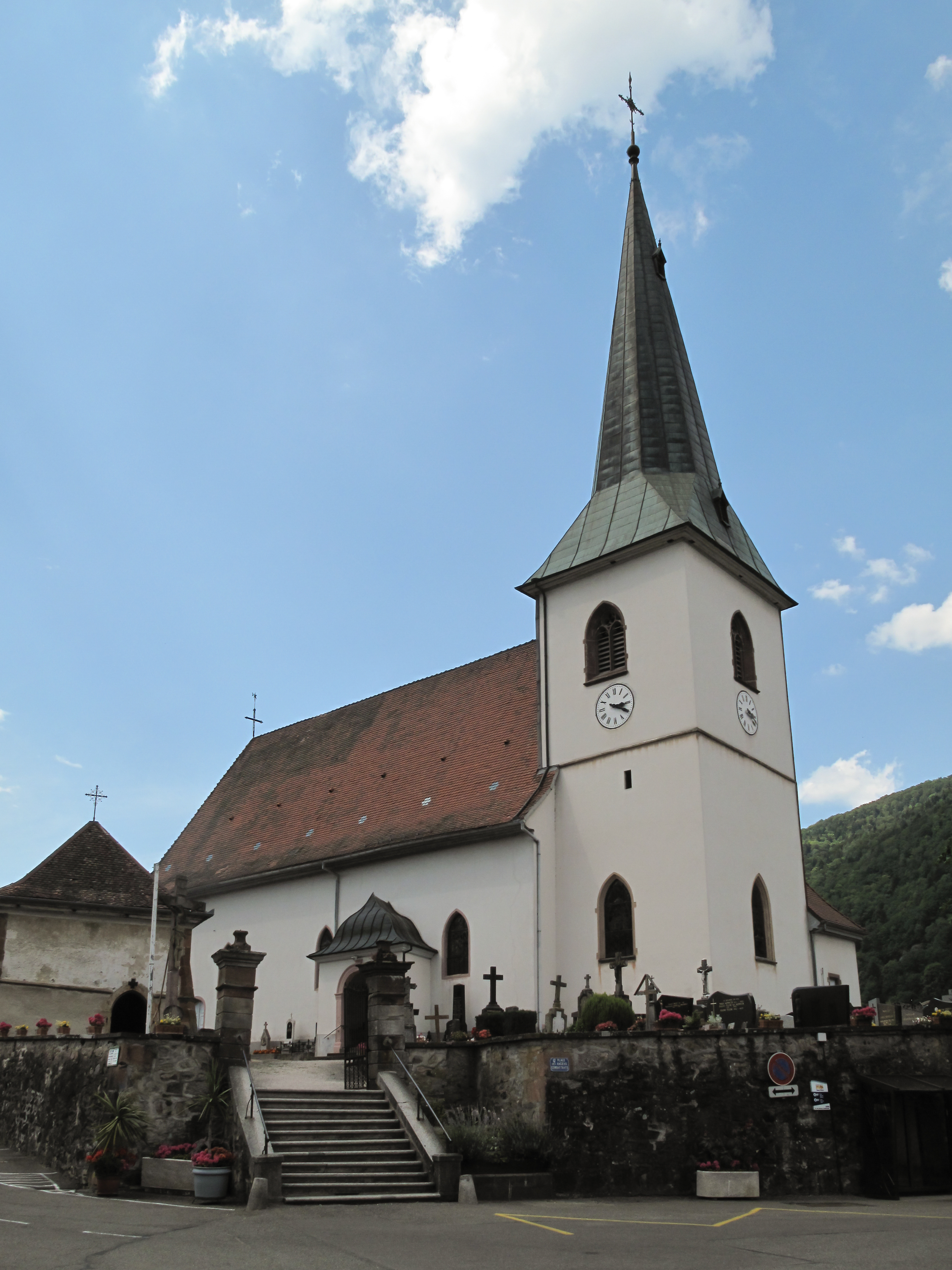
Sewen, church: l'église Notre Dame

== See also ==
- Communes of the Haut-Rhin department
