= Kerkini =

Kerkini Κερκίνη
- Settlement
- Location within the regional unit

- Location within Greece
- Coordinates: 41°13′N 23°05′E
- Country: Greece
- Administrative region: Central Macedonia
- Regional unit: Serres
- Municipality: Sintiki
- Time zone: UTC+2 (EET)
  - Summer (DST): UTC+3 (EEST)
- Vehicle registration: ΕΡ
- Website: www.sintiki.gov.gr

Kerkini (Greek: Κερκίνη, Bulgarian: Бутково) is a village in the Serres regional unit, Greece. It is named after ancient Kerkinitis lake (see map of Macedon).

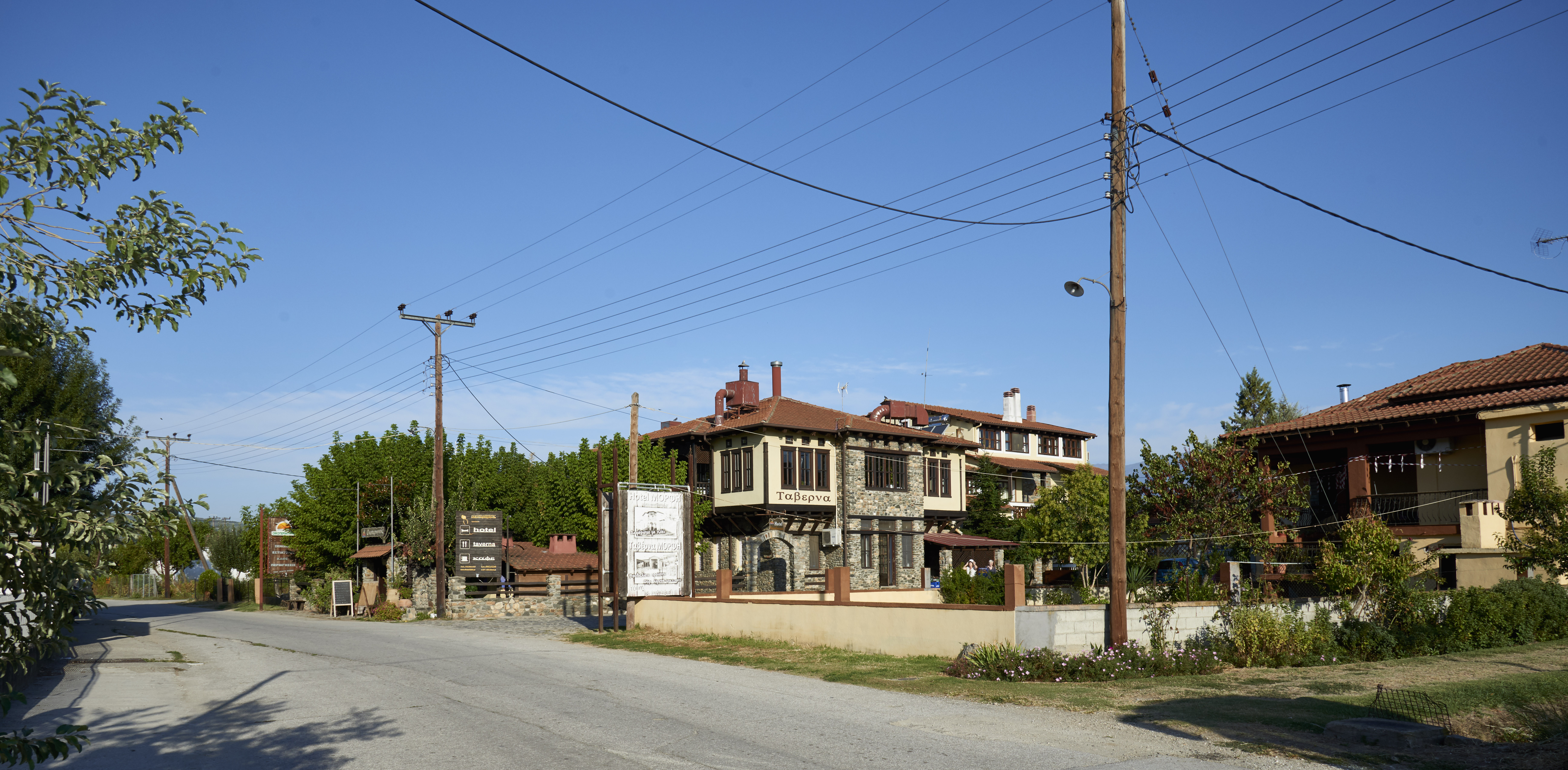
Hotel Oikoperiigitis in Kerkini

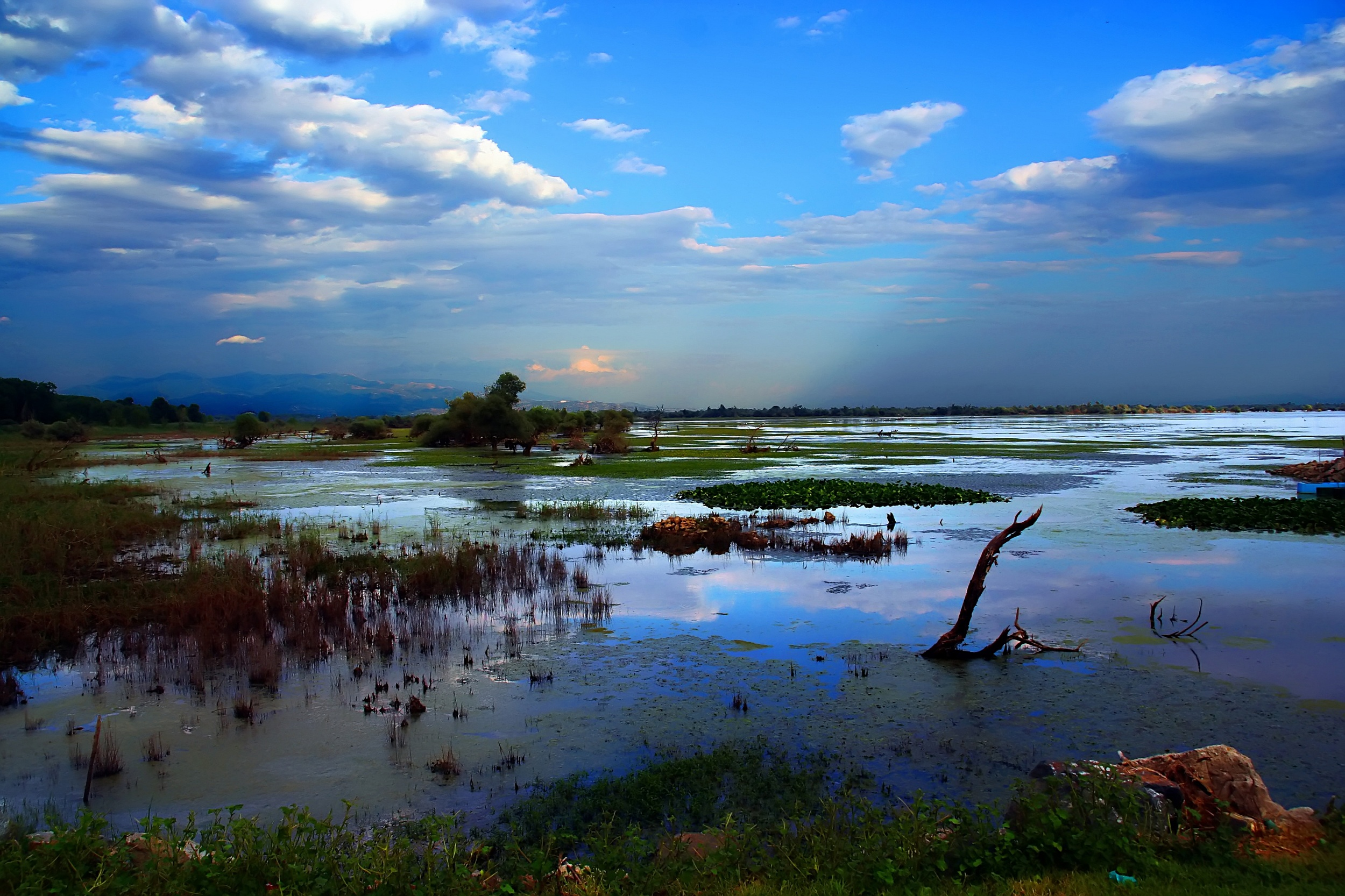
Lake Kerkini by Vlahos Vaggelis

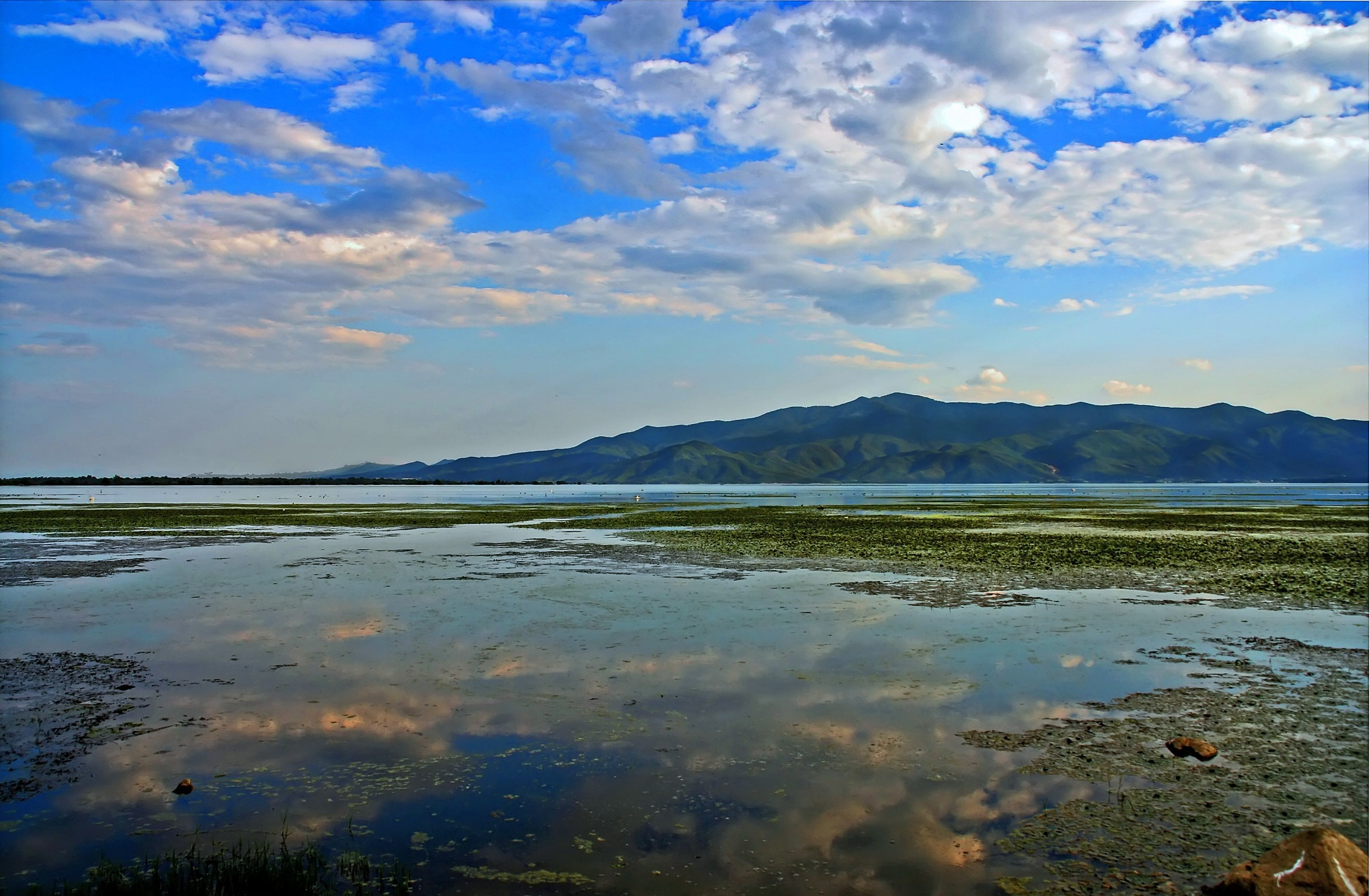
Lake Kerkini by Vlahos Vaggelis

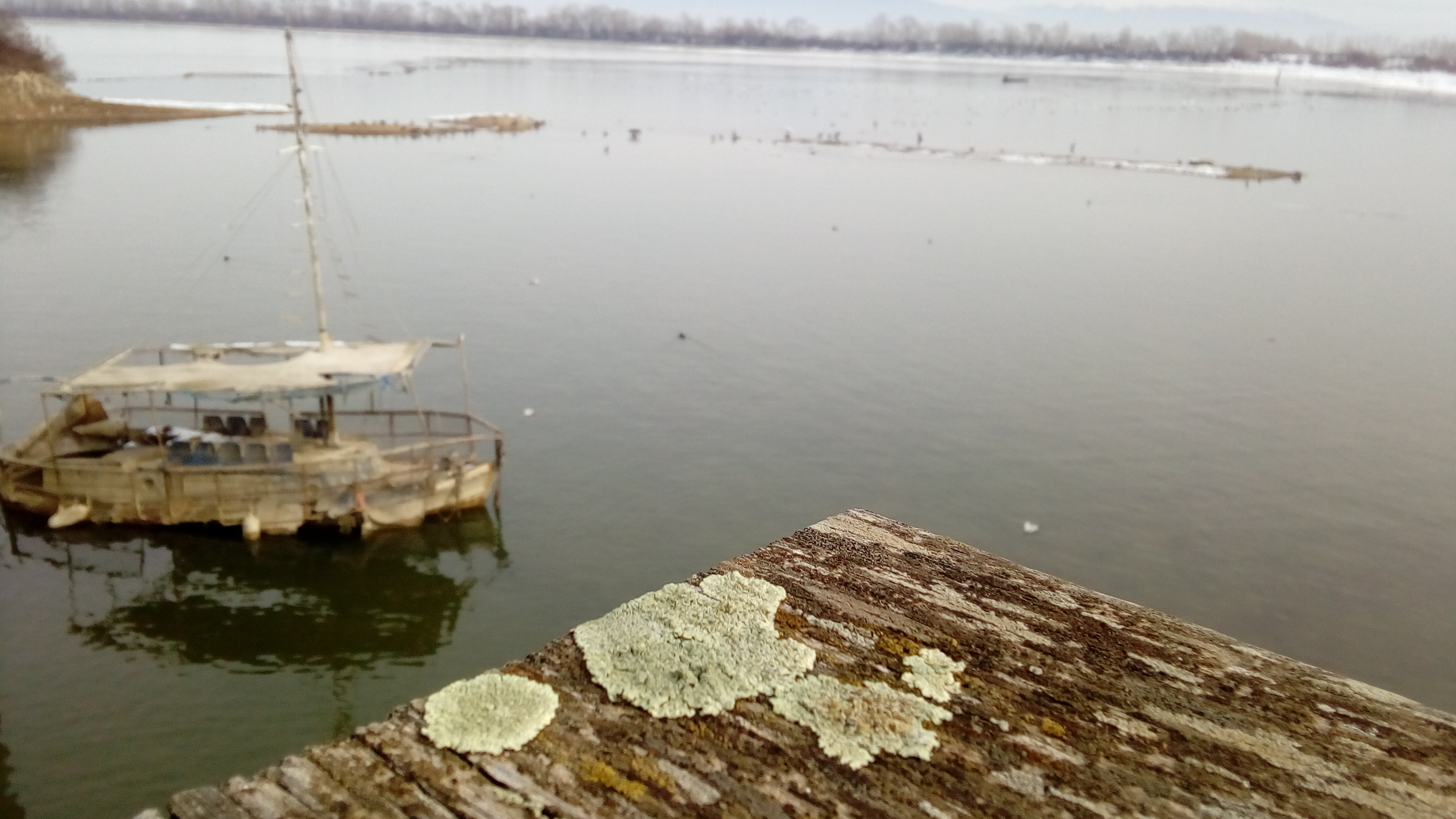
Small boat on Kerkini Lake.
