= Maurice Sarrail =

French general of the First World War (1856–1929)

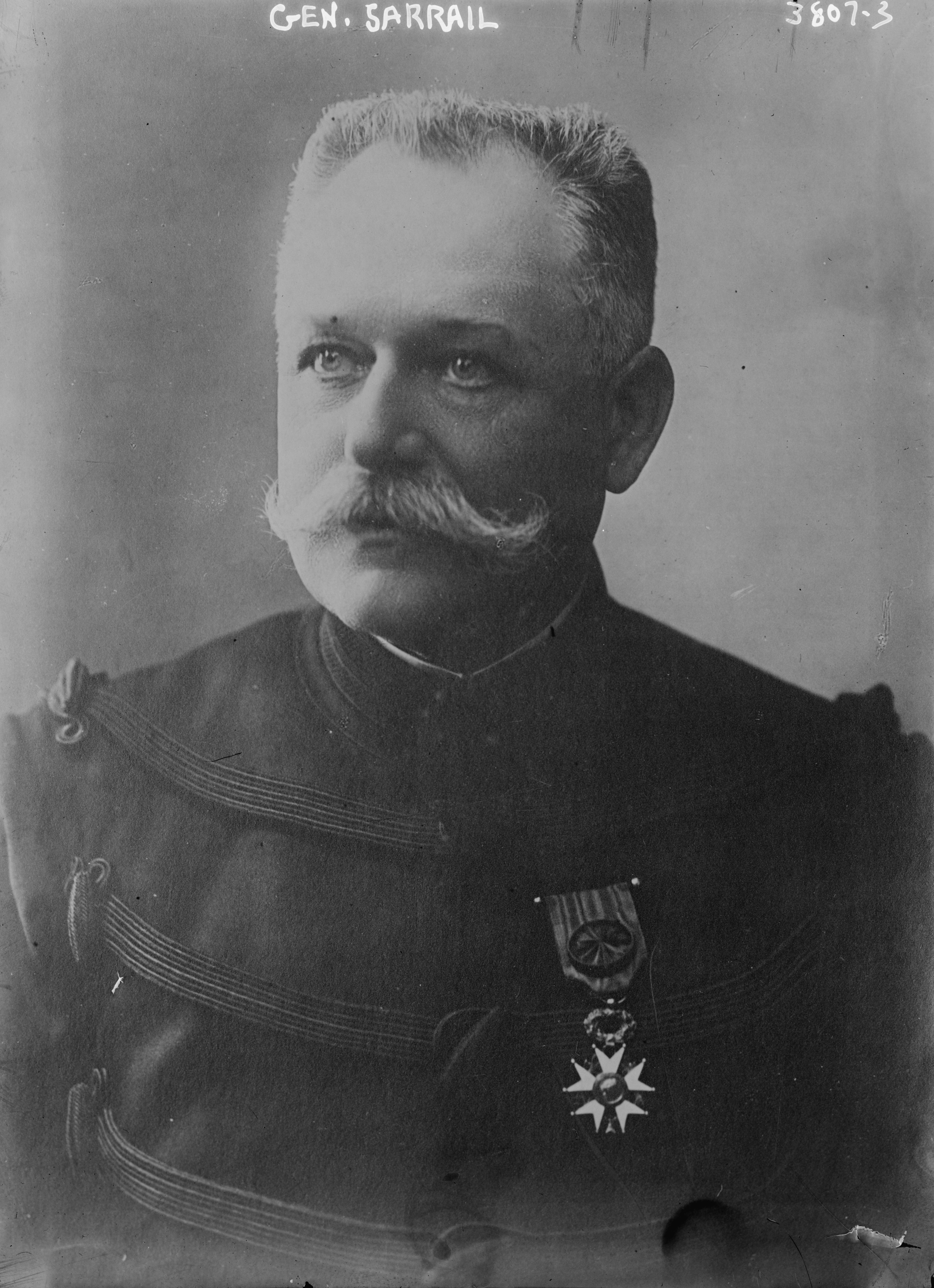

High Commissioner of the Levant
- In office 29 November 1924 – 23 December 1925
- President: Gaston Doumergue
- Prime Minister: Édouard Herriot; Paul Painlevé; Aristide Briand
- Minister of the Colonies: Édouard Daladier; Andre Hesse; Léon Perrier
- Preceded by: Maxime Weygand
- Succeeded by: Henry de Jouvenel

Commander of the Army of the Levant
- In office 2 January – 4 November 1925
- President: Alexandre Millerand; Gaston Doumergue
- Minister of War: Charles Nollet; Paul Painlevé; Édouard Daladier
- High Commissioner: Himself
- Preceded by: Maxime Weygand
- Succeeded by: Maurice Gamelin

Commander of the Allied Army of the Orient
- In office 11 August 1916 – 15 December 1917
- President: Raymond Poincaré
- Minister of War: Pierre Roques; Hubert Lyautey; Lucien Lacaze (as interim); Paul Painlevé
- Chief of Staff: Joseph Joffre; Robert Nivelle; Philippe Pétain; Ferdinand Foch
- Preceded by: Military unit created
- Succeeded by: Adolphe Guillaumat

Commander of the Armée d'Orient
- In office 5 October 1915 – 11 August 1916
- President: Raymond Poincaré
- Minister of War: Alexandre Millerand; Joseph Gallieni; Pierre Roques
- Chief of Staff: Joseph Joffre
- Preceded by: Military unit created
- Succeeded by: Victor Cordonnier

Commander of the 3rd Army
- In office 30 August 1914 – 22 July 1915
- President: Raymond Poincaré
- Minister of War: Alexandre Millerand
- Chief of Staff: Joseph Joffre
- Preceded by: Pierre Ruffey
- Succeeded by: Georges Louis Humbert

Commander of the 6th Army Corps
- In office 24 April – 30 August 1914
- President: Raymond Poincaré
- Minister of War: Joseph Noulens; Théophile Delcassé; Adolphe Messimy; Alexandre Millerand
- Chief of Staff: Joseph Joffre
- Preceded by: Albert d'Amade
- Succeeded by: Martial Justin Verraux

Commander of the 8th Army Corps
- In office 1 November 1913 – 24 April 1914
- President: Raymond Poincaré
- Minister of War: Eugène Étienne; Joseph Noulens
- Chief of Staff: Joseph Joffre
- Preceded by: Paul Édouard Pouradier-Duteil
- Succeeded by: Marie Joseph Louis Dominique de Castelli

Personal details
- Born: Maurice Paul Emmanuel Sarrail; 6 April 1856 Carcassonne, France
- Died: 23 March 1929 (aged 72) Paris, France
- Awards: Grand Cross of the Legion of Honor; Médaille militaire Croix de guerre 1914–1918

Military service
- Allegiance: France
- Branch/service: French Army
- Years of service: 1877–1925
- Rank: Général de division
- Commands: Third Army
- Battles/wars: World War I Great Syrian Revolt

Maurice Paul Emmanuel Sarrail (6 April 1856 – 23 March 1929) was a French general of the First World War. Sarrail's openly socialist political connections made him a rarity amongst the Catholics, conservatives and monarchists who dominated the French Army officer corps under the Third Republic before the war, and were the main reason why he was appointed to command at Salonika.

At the start of the war, Sarrail commanded VI Corps then Third Army in the Ardennes and around Verdun, where his army played an important role in the final stages of the First Battle of the Marne and where he took the credit for holding Verdun (later the site of an important battle in 1916). He was dismissed for poor leadership, amidst political uproar, in July 1915.

The Salonika campaign – chosen out of several strategic options presented by Sarrail – was intended originally to support Serbia, with Bulgaria entering the war on the side of the Central Powers, and later (as the Gallipoli campaign was winding down) to provide a chance for France to assert her economic and political influence over Greece and the declining Ottoman Empire. Sarrail ended up commanding a multinational Allied force amidst political intrigue and a state of near civil war in Greece, whose King Constantine was pro-German, whilst the Prime Minister Venizelos was pro-Allied and also keen to gain territory from the Turks in western Anatolia. Despite a number of offensives, Sarrail's forces did not succeed either in conquering Bulgaria or in preventing the Central Powers' conquest of Serbia in 1915 or Romania in 1916. Sarrail was dismissed from his Salonika command in December 1917.

He later played a role in the French suppression of the Great Syrian Revolt in the mid-1920s.

== Biography ==
=== Early career ===
Sarrail was born at Carcassonne, and attended St Cyr, graduating in third place on 1 October 1877. He was posted as a sub-lieutenant to the infantry. His regimental service and promotion followed the normal course. He was promoted to lieutenant in October 1882, captain in 1887, and chef-de-bataillon (major) in 1897. In 1901 he was appointed Commandant of the École Militaire d'Infanterie (St. Maixent), where rankers were turned into loyal republican officers.

In 1902 he was promoted lieutenant-colonel. From 1904 to 1906 he was Military Commandant of the Palais Bourbon, which housed the Chamber of Deputies, and he was promoted colonel in 1905. In 1907 he became Director of Infantry at the War Office, an appointment which he held for four years. He was made General de Brigade in 1908. In 1911 he was promoted General de Division when his radical Socialist friend Caillaux formed his first government, and on 1 November 1913 he was given command of VIII Corps.

Unlike many French officers, Sarrail was a freemason and a Dreyfusard. After a left-wing government came to power in 1914, he was due to be appointed Commander-in-Chief designate in Joffre's place in the autumn, but war broke out before this could take place.

=== First World War: western front 1914–15 ===
==== Battle of the Ardennes ====
At Virton in the Ardennes in August 1914 he commanded VI Corps, part of Ruffey's Third Army. VI Corps was strengthened with an extra (third) infantry division, and faced German VI Reserve Corps. Sarrail's was the only corps of Ruffey's Third Army to withstand the strong German counterattacks (the others being Brochin's V Corps and Victor-Rene Broelle's IV Corps). It was eventually forced to fall back to avoid encirclement. Sarrail told 42nd Division, which formed the rearguard, "you have given proof of cran (guts)".

On 30 August Sarrail was promoted to succeed Ruffey in command of Third Army. In early September IV Corps was removed from his command and sent to Maunoury's new Sixth Army near Paris.

==== Fighting around Verdun ====
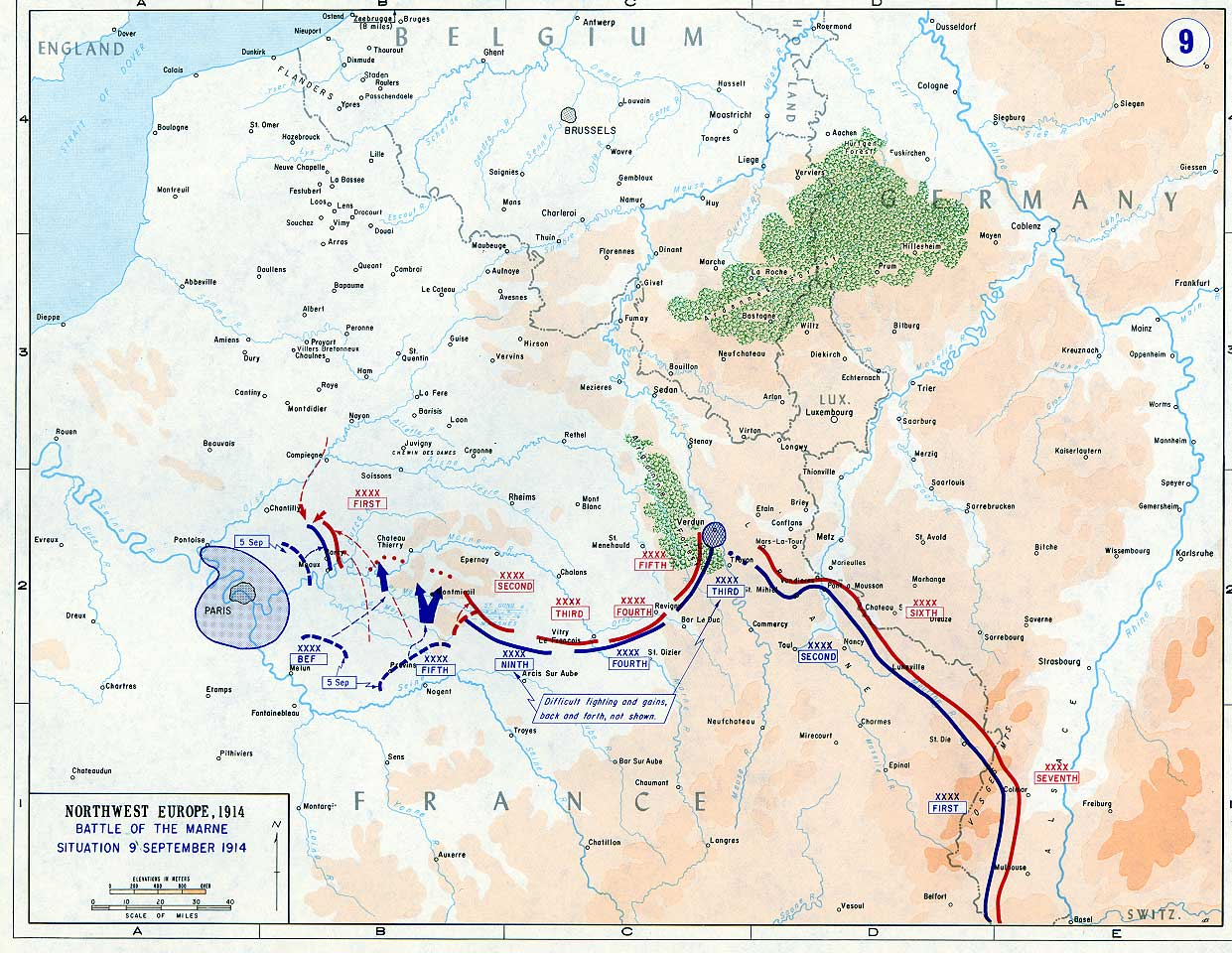
Battle of the Marne positions on 9 September.

In early September Sarrail, along with Franchet d’Esperey (Fifth Army) and Foch (Ninth Army), was ordered (Instruction Generale No 5) to stop retreating and be ready to counterattack. However, during the Battle of the Marne, unlike those other French generals, Sarrail was ordered simply to pin down German Crown Prince Wilhelm's Fifth Army opposite him, in the vicinity of Verdun.

The Revigny Gap had opened up between the right of de Langle's Fourth Army and the left of Third Army. A similar, larger, gap, 20 km wide, had opened up between Fourth Army's left and the right of Foch's Ninth Army. Whilst Joffre was bringing up XV and XXI Corps from Lorraine to plug the gaps, the Germans attacked, although these attacks were unsuccessful in part as a result of squabbling between Albrecht (commander of German Fourth Army) who wanted Wilhelm to support him whilst he enveloped de Langle from the west, whilst Wilhelm wanted Albrecht to support him while he pushed into the Revigny Gap between de Langle and Sarrail. Wilhelm eventually appealed directly to his father the Kaiser.

Sarrail attacked on the morning of 6 September, his right pivoting on Verdun whilst the main body of his force, 20 km to the southwest, attacked in a roughly north-westerly direction. Joffre, the French commander-in-chief, had expected Sarrail to take the German Fifth Army on its eastern flank as it advanced south from the Argonne into the Revigny Gap, but instead Crown Prince Wilhelm was advancing south-east towards Bar-le-Duc, so his army and Sarrail's clashed head on. Sarrail's forces were again mauled by von Pritzelwitz's VI Corps, which had beaten the French colonials so badly at Rossigny, earning Sarrail (6 September) a blistering written rebuke from Joffre. Joffre criticised Sarrail's men for abandoning equipment and officers for poor leadership and demanded that he "re-establish order, taking whatever measures necessary".

Beginning on 8 September, the Germans were also attacking around Troyon (south-east of Verdun), threatening the heights of the Meuse in Sarrail's rear. Combined with the chance of breakthrough in the Revigny Gap, there was a chance that Verdun and Third Army would be encircled altogether, allowing the Germans then to attack Second Army in Lorraine. At 20.00 on 8 September Joffre authorised Sarrail to break contact with the Fortified Region of Verdun, so as to shift his forces west and better block the German advance. Sarrail refused and would later describe himself as the "Saviour of Verdun", claiming that his actions had saved Verdun from capture. This is an exaggeration: Verdun, defended by 350 heavy and 442 light guns, and 65,774 soldiers, was probably in little real danger of immediate capture. His actions, which risked the encirclement of his army, are described as "churlish" by Herwig, whilst Doughty is equally critical.

The German Fifth Army made a final major attack on 10 September, running into heavy fire from the soixante-quinzes ("black butchers" as the Germans called them) of Micheler's V Corps and Verraux's VI corps. Moltke, increasingly concerned at the failure of the German attacks at Nancy, initially rescinded his permission for the final night attack until Crown Prince Wilhelm threatened to appeal to his father again. In the first ten days of September the German Fifth Army suffered 15,000 casualties, with some units suffering up to 40% officer casualties. At 9am on 10 September Lt-Col Hentsch, returning from ordering von Kluck and von Bülow to fall back from the Marne at the west of the German line, ordered Fifth Army to retreat also, an order which Wilhelm and his chief of staff Schmidt von Knobelsdorff refused to obey unless received in writing from the Kaiser or from Moltke. That day Sarrail was able to signal Joffre "situation satisfactory", whilst at 2pm Joffre was able to inform Millerand (War Minister) that the Battle of the Marne was now an "incontestable victory".

Despite the German retreat, neither Third nor Fourth Army made much progress. Joffre rebuked Sarrail over the telephone on 13 September 1914, demanding a formal inquiry of how Sarrail had "not been informed" of the enemy retreat 48 hours previously, a demand which Sarrail sidestepped by having his staff telephone a routine progress report to Joffre. To the south-east of Verdun the Germans took Fort Troyon on 13 September and Fort Camp des Romains on 26 September, creating the Saint-Mihiel Salient. The salient cut off one of the railway lines supplying Verdun, which would force the defenders to rely heavily on road transport in the 1916 battle.

==== Winter 1914–15 ====
The railway into Verdun from Paris and Chalons, which passed through Aubreville, 20 km west of Verdun, was under shelling from the German occupied Heights of Aubreville, 7 km to the north. After attacks by French artillery, directed by aircraft, had failed to do the trick, Sarrail spent much of the winter of 1914–15 attempting to drive the Germans from the Heights. Third Army suffered 10,000 casualties alone in November.

On 7 November Sarrail reported that in the previous month alone sixteen men of Third Army had been sentenced to death for self-inflicted wounds or for deserting their posts.

==== Argonne and dismissal: 1915 ====
Early in 1915 Sarrail's political allies touted him as a replacement for Joffre as commander-in-chief.

The Germans attacked in the Argonne on 20 and 30 June and 12 and 13 July 1915. Joffre complained that Third Army had performed poorly and had "yielded the initiative to the adversary". Joffre transferred Third Army from Dubail's Eastern Army Group to de Castelnau's Central Army Group, and on 16 July Dubail wrote to de Castelnau expressing his concerns about Sarrail's leadership, and noting that the Germans opposite had kept up an "aggressive attitude" without undue casualties, whereas Sarrail had attempted to maintain "moral ascendancy" with many small attacks, and had ended up being driven back. On 16 July Joffre asked Dubail to investigate the "persistent lack of success" in the Argonne. Dubail sent two separate reports to Joffre: the one on operations was partly positive, but criticised Sarrail's plans for being "too simplistic" and for keeping his divisions in "rigid zones". The report on morale criticised the "malaise" at Third Army – "lack of mutual confidence" between Sarrail and the XXXII Corps commander and problems in Third Army staff, including allegations of false reports being sent to higher headquarters – and recommended Sarrail's removal.

Joffre replaced Sarrail with Humbert on 22 July 1915, an act which created the war's first direct clash between politicians and soldiers in France. The resulting uproar on the political left nearly swept away the Sacred Union government. During the preparations for the upcoming offensive, Castelnau supervised Humbert closely, criticising Sarrail's legacy of poor construction of obstacles and shelters and "defective practices" amongst the artillery.

=== Salonika ===
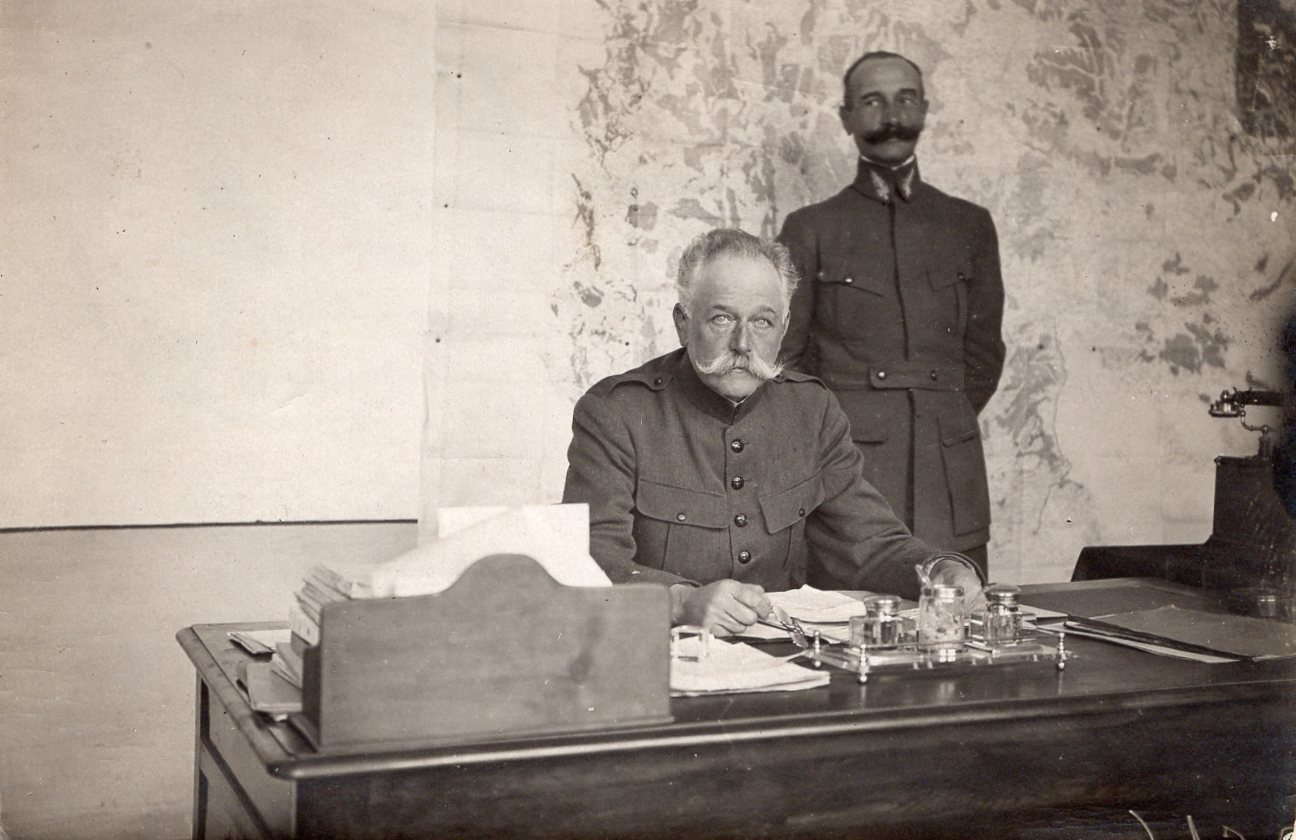
General Maurice Sarrail and his chief of staff at Salonika

==== 1915 ====
===== Strategic options =====
Viviani (French Prime Minister) shored up his coalition government by appointing Sarrail, a republican socialist general, to command an expedition to the Eastern Mediterranean. He was initially given a British division (committed with great reluctance by the British authorities) and Bailloud's division from the Dardanelles. Joffre described Sarrail as "a factious general", suspected him of having plotted a coup d’etat in France and would have preferred Franchet d’Esperey for the job. Sarrail initially felt that commanding a corps-sized force was a severe demotion. After meeting Millerand (War Secretary) on 3 August he accepted on condition the name of his force was changed to "Army of the Orient", a title with Napoleonic overtones, and that it was reinforced with an extra four divisions, and was not under British generals. He was formally appointed on 5 August. Sarrail's memo of 11 August proposed landing at Smyrna, Alexandretta or Salonika or land in the Bay of Adramyti and march on Chanak. Joffre was strongly critical of the logistical feasibility of these proposals. Throughout August President Poincaré, Viviani and Millerand pushed Joffre to release four divisions for the planned Asian expedition, and he eventually promised to do so after his autumn offensive. He had the Office of National Security Studies criticise the logistics of the operation.

On 31 August 1915 Kitchener (British War Secretary) was informed that France was to land six divisions on the Asian coast of the Dardanelles. Joffre was probably involving the British to help block Sarrail's plans. The entry of Bulgaria into the war on 6 September, threatening Serbia's rear, finally meant that Sarrail's more ambitious plans had to be shelved. Joffre had already agreed (4 August) to a military mission going to Salonika, but it was not ready until 22 September, the day the Bulgarian Army mobilised. On 28 September Sarrail was told he was to command an expedition at Salonika, not in Turkey-in-Asia. The Greek government, pro-Allied but technically still neutral, went through the motions of formal diplomatic protest. Sarrail, asked by the War Minister for his views, recommended that the British be urged to maintain their presence at Gallipoli for reasons of Allied prestige. He urged that 30,000 British troops defend Salonika, whilst three or four French corps would push up towards the Bulgarian capital of Sofia. Joffre disapproved of much of this but was only in a position to obstruct, not to block.

===== Allies occupy Salonika =====
The pro-German King Constantine dismissed the pro-Allied Prime Minister Venizelos on 5 October 1915, replacing him with Zaimis. On 5 October landings began at Salonika. Belgrade, the Serb capital, fell to the Central Powers on 9 October. On 12 October Sarrail arrived at Salonika and took command from General Bailloud. He at once ordered an advance to Strumica station, over the Serb border (Bailloud had previously been given contradictory instructions as to how far to advance). Under Serb pressure he agreed to advance as far as Krivolak, but not Skopje (capital of Macedonia, which was part of Serbia at the time), but was checked in the Vardar and Tcherna Valleys. His arrival had been too little and too late either to prevent German, Austro-Hungarian and Bulgarian forces overrunning Serbia, or to give the Serbs somewhere to retreat, ultimately forcing the Serb Army to retreat to Albania. He later wrote in his memoirs "one cannot do something with nothing". On 12 November Gallieni, now French War Minister in the new Briand government, ordered him to fall back on a fortified position around Salonika, but Sarrail replied that a retreat would be bad for prestige and would face resistance from Greek troops along the line of communication and at Salonika. Sarrail held his positions on the Tcherna for a week, hoping that the new French government would agree to build up his force from three divisions to four corps, and after receiving a dusty answer from Gallieni wrote to members of the government and appealed to Kitchener when he visited on 17 November. On 20 November Sarrail relieved a local commander who ordered a withdrawal, but on 21 November he was informed by Gallieni (who thought him "indecisive and not up to the task", but gave him liberty to decide when to retreat) that the French government would not be reinforcing him, leaving him little choice but to withdraw, and on 23 November he gave the order to pull back. By 12 December Sarrail's forces were holding a perimeter 20 km around Salonika. Sarrail forced the surrender of the Greek artillery in the town.

By December Sarrail's force had grown to 150,000 men. On 9 and 11 December Kitchener, Grey (British Foreign Secretary), Briand (French Prime Minister), Gallieni (French War Minister) and Joffre (French Commander-in-Chief, and who had just been given authority over Salonika also) met in Paris and agreed to hold Salonika. Joffre had humoured an impractical Russian proposal that Budapest be taken by converging Italian and Russian thrusts from the Isonzo Front and Galicia, along with a thrust of ten corps up from Salonika. Joffre also argued that 150,000 troops would be enough to hold the bridgehead, but sent Castelnau on a fact-finding mission. Castelnau reported to Joffre, Briand, Gallieni and Poincaré on Christmas Day, criticising Sarrail for the same issues which had led to his relief from Third Army, and for his "grave mistakes" in remaining at Salonika and only visiting the front at Krivolak once. Joffre rejected Sarrail's plea for two more divisions, but after lobbying by Sarrail Gallieni directed him to send another division.

==== 1916 ====
===== Spring =====
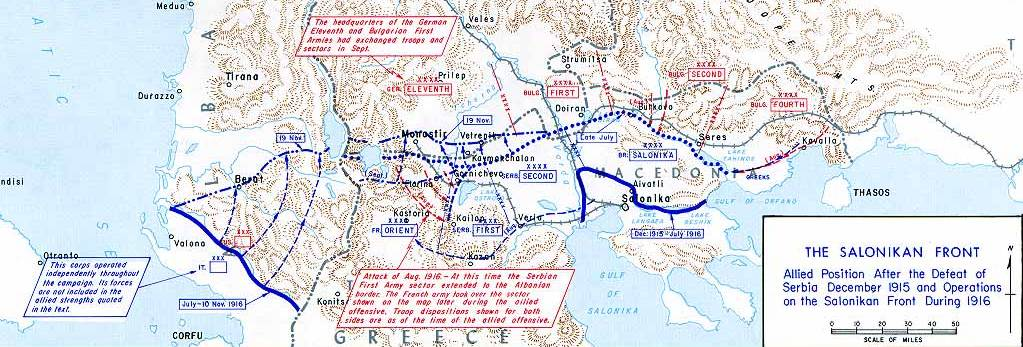
Fighting along the Greek border, 1916

The Serb Army was evacuated from Albania in December and January by French and Italian transports, escorted by British and French warships. Some were evacuated to Bizerte, but most to Corfu which was occupied on 11 January, to the fury of the Greek government, by a battalion of chasseurs alpins. The Serbs on Corfu were then organised into six divisions of 20,000 men apiece under French General Piarron de Mondesir.

In January 1916 Sarrail was granted command of all Allied forces in the Macedonian theatre. It had been agreed that there would be no action at Salonika without British agreement. The British chief of the imperial general staff (CIGS), General Sir William Robertson, was suspicious that the Allied presence at Salonika, which the French wanted the British to reinforce, was being kept going solely to find employment for Sarrail, which is not quite true – Joffre hoped to bring Romania into the war on the Allied side. On 4 March 1916, two days after the Germans attacked Verdun, Joffre – to the irritation of Robertson – ordered Sarrail to "study" an offensive to pin down Central Powers troops. Sarrail replied that he needed 21 divisions and was unable to do anything major before the Serbs arrived. In March Royalist Greek troops were ordered not to oppose Austro-Hungarian and Bulgarian forces.

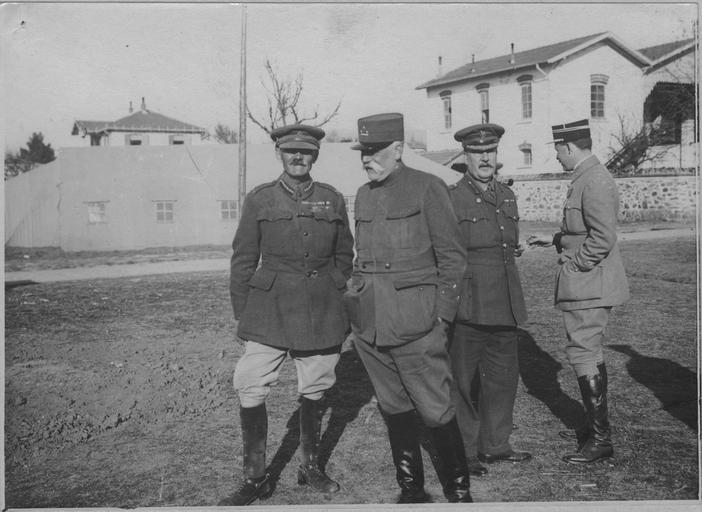
Lieutenant-General Sir Bryan Mahon, commanding British forces at Salonika, and General Maurice Sarrail, along with other senior officers, at Salonika, March 1916.

On 10 March Joffre wrote to Sarrail that his presence at Salonika was intended as a bluff to tie down Central Powers forces, whilst at the same time aiming to draw Greece and Romania to the Allied side, but at the same time he was to make "real preparations" for a major offensive. At the Allied conference on 12 March Russia and Serbia pushed for a major offensive from Salonika, but this did not meet with Anglo-French approval. Joffre gave Sarrail permission (20 April) for a "demonstration", but five days later wrote to Robertson proposing a major offensive. This did not meet with British approval.

On 13 April 1916, whilst in Salonika, the British 85th Brigade performed a ceremonial parade when General Sarrail was invested with the Grand Cross of St Michael and St George. The location of this ceremony is not given.

===== Summer =====
Early in 1916 Sarrail ordered his forces up 70 km from Salonika to form a larger perimeter from the Vardar to the Gulf of Strymon. In May 1916 he extended his line west to Florina. The refitted Serb divisions were transported into Salonika, escorted by a French naval squadron which had based itself at Argostoli, again to the fury of the Greek government. 122,000 Serbs arrived in May. In May Greek forces surrendered the fortress of Rupel on the Struma without a fight, and in early June Sarrail used alleged collaboration between the commandant of a Greek frontier fortress and the Bulgars as an excuse to proclaim a state of siege in Salonika and Allied jurisdiction over the area occupied by his troops. The French took control of rail, postal and telegraph services, whilst Sarrail sent a naval squadron to threaten Athens. French Prime Minister Aristide Briand supported this, but British suspicions were further raised, particularly by local French entrepreneurial activity and the opening of French schools. Under Allied political pressure King Constantine dismissed Prime Minister Skouloudis on 22 June, but refused to disarm the Greek troops at Salonika. By mid-July the Serb divisions had moved into position on the left of Sarrail's front, with the British, whose government were still lukewarm, on the right. On 23 July Sarrail was placed in command of all Allied forces at Salonika, although they retained right of appeal to their governments. A brigade of Russians arrived in late July. By early August there were 382,728 Allied soldiers at Salonika, and an Italian division arrived in the second week of August, bringing the total up to 400,000 men. Given the effects of malaria and the need to detach troops to build and guard transport links, he lacked reserves. His British forces lacked artillery, although he was given 40 French aircraft and some French passenger liners to use as hospital ships.

Joffre and Robertson were urging attacks, whilst at the same time wanting to keep the focus on the Western Front. In June and July Joffre (who was keen to keep Sarrail out of France) once again carried out a charade of seeking British approval for a major offensive at Salonika, with the British suspecting that he was merely going through the motions. The Italians were a source of friction, whilst the Greek government attempted to obstruct supply and Greek Army reservists committed sabotage. As part of Romanian entry to the war, Sarrail was at last ordered to commit to a major offensive. Lloyd George, who had just become British War Secretary in June, agreed to commit the British troops at Salonika to such an offensive.

Lieutenant General Sir George Milne (in a letter to Robertson, dated 20 July), who succeeded Mahon in command of British forces in Salonika, thought Sarrail "A strong man with big ideas and outlook with great brain power but of a conceited, excitable, impetuous and unscrupulous nature … Possibly a good strategist but not a great tactician … His mental calibre far and away above his Staff". On 1 August Sarrail set up a "Commercial Bureau for French Importations" with links to French Chambers of Commerce at Grenoble, Marseilles, Lyon and Dijon, and on 3 August Sarrail wrote to Briand "We ought to prepare for after the war by immediately imposing our products and trademarks on places regained by our armies". Sarrail was suspicious of the Italians under General Pettiti, believing (wrongly) that Italy also had colonial designs on the region.

An Allied offensive was planned for 1 August, but on 25 July Romania requested a delay. Eventually on 17 August it was agreed that Sarrail should attack on 20 August, and the Romanians on 28 August. Victor Cordonnier, chosen by Sarrail from Joffre's shortlist of three, arrived at Salonika on 11 August to command the French contingent. But the Bulgars struck first on 17 August, reinforced by two German divisions brought from the Vosges to the River Vardar. With Bulgarian morale crumbling, further German battalions were brought from Champagne, Poland and the Vosges, as well as some heavy guns from Verdun. The Bulgars began a major offensive against Sarrail's right and left – initially successful on the latter. Sarrail's forces held off the offensive with difficulty by 28 August and Sarrail recast his plans to avoid attacking the Germans on the Vardar.

===== Autumn =====
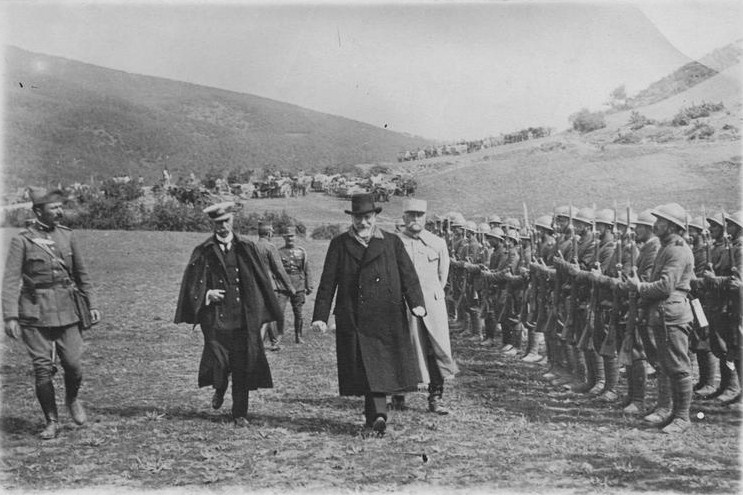
Sarrail (at the right) with Venizelos and admiral Kountouriotis inspect Greek troops of the "National Defence" at the Macedonian front

On 27 August 1916 Colonel Zymbrakakis, a local hero of the Balkan Wars, established a "Committee of Public Safety" in Salonika with Sarrail's open support, and pledged to establish a "National Army" which would fight the Bulgars harder than the Royalist officers who had surrendered their positions in May. Some Royalist Greek forces defected, whilst others were coerced by Venizelist Greeks into changing sides. In September, an Allied naval force arrived off Piraeus, but King Constantine rejected its most important terms. On 10 September an Allied counteroffensive began. On 12 September Serb troops, supported by French artillery, attacked Mount Kajmakcalan, capturing and holding it over a fortnight of fighting. Two French divisions and a Russian brigade attacked towards Kenail and the British up from the Struma Valley, at each point meeting trenches dug under German supervision. By 17 September Zouaves and the French Foreign Legion occupied Florina.

With French help, Venizelos escaped from Athens on 27 September. After gathering support in Crete he reached Salonika on 9 October, where Sarrail greeted him at the quayside. Venizelos established a Provisional Government of National Defence. He was suspicious of Sarrail and Briand, and keen to keep them at arm's length, instead encouraging closer links with the British. In October 1916 Leblois replaced Cordonnier in command of the French troops. By mid-November the (Venizelist) Greek National Army was 23,000 strong. By 19 November Sarrail's forces took Monastir (Bitola, over the border in Macedonia, part of Serbia at the time, roughly north of Florina), allowing Sarrail to claim the first French victory since the Marne, 26 months earlier, before winter forced an end to operations.

On 1 December 3,000 French soldiers and British marines were landed in Athens, seeking to recover ten batteries of mountain artillery, but they were withdrawn under cover of naval gunfire after they had suffered 212 casualties, including 54 deaths, at the hands of Greek troops and hostile crowds. King Constantine remained in power to continue his policy of attacks on the Allied lines of communications. On 10 December, Henry Descoin, the commander of the French garrison of Korçë, with Sarrail's approval, declared the Autonomous Albanian Republic of Korçë in Koritza, asserting control over Epirus and appointing Themistokli Gërmenji as prefect. French troops had been active there and in southern Albania, attempting to suppress the local comitaji bandits.

The fall of Bucharest (6 December) not only ruled out a Russo-Romanian attack on Bulgaria, but also made possible a Central Powers attack on Salonika. One of Joffre's last official duties (11 December) was to order Sarrail to cease his offensive and establish a strong defensive position, from which further offensives might be launched in the future. General Roques, Minister of War, had been on a fact-finding mission to Salonika after Britain, Italy and Russia had pushed for Sarrail's dismissal. To Prime Minister Briand's and Joffre's surprise, Rocques returned recommending that Sarrail's forces be built up to thirty divisions ready for an attack on Bulgaria. He did not specifically praise Sarrail, but recommended that Sarrail no longer report to Joffre. Coming on the back of the disappointing results of the Somme campaign and the fall of Romania, Rocques' report further discredited Briand and Joffre and added to the Parliamentary Deputies' demands for a closed session. On 27 November the Council of Ministers met to debate rescinding the decree of 2 December 1915 which had placed Sarrail under Joffre, thus beginning the political manoeuvres which led to Joffre's resignation.

The failure of the Allied offensive on the Macedonian front was bitterly resented by the Romanian troops, who ironically chanted: "O Sarrail, Sarrail, Sarrail,/ Noi ne batem și tu stai!" (Oh Sarrail, Sarrail, Sarrail,/ We're fighting and you stand still!). Nevertheless, Romania also partially contributed to the failure by not dispatching 150,000 troops towards Bulgaria, in conjunction with Sarrail's offensive, as agreed upon in a military convention on 23 July in Chantilly.

The British still hoped for a reconciliation between the Greek factions and hoped that a monarchist Greece would be less under French influence than a republic. However, on 21 December London and Paris recognised the Provisional Government in Salonika. By the end of the year most of Romania had been overrun and Allied hopes of imminent Austro-Hungarian collapse had been disappointed. The Germans were referring to Salonika as an "internment camp" and Sarrail was highly sensitive to comparisons to Bazaine's encirclement in Metz in 1870. At Christmas 1916 Christmas cards – in French and bearing a portrait of Sarrail – were sent to the families of British, French and Italian troops at Salonika.

==== 1917 ====
On 3 January 1917 Sarrail and Milne arrived at the Rome Conference, independently of one another. Hankey thought Sarrail "a man of quite exceptional charm". Lloyd George, now British Prime Minister and keen to avoid a repetition of the Battle of the Somme, thought him "a remarkable, fascinating character, handsome, impulsive, full of fire", although fearful about the effect on US opinion he rejected Sarrail's suggestion that he be given a fortnight to crush the royalists in Athens. Sarrail was confirmed as "Commander-in-Chief of the Allied Army of the Orient" with the national contingent commanders having right of appeal to their own governments.

By January 1917 Sarrail's force at Salonika included British divisions, eight French divisions (including fifteen Senegalese battalions, some of which were used in front line combat), six Serbian divisions, two Russian brigades and an Italian division. Sarrail was sent two colonial divisions in December and two more in January. The weather was appalling – rain and then the Great Vardar Blizzard at the end of February. Sarrail was not given permission to attack until 9 March. By the time of St-Jean-de-Maurienne (Anglo-Franco-Italian talks on 19–20 April) Sarrail had still not launched the offensive promised three months earlier, and Lloyd George had lost patience with him and come reluctantly to agree with Robertson that the British contingent at Salonika might be better employed in Palestine.

Sarrail launched a general offensive between 22 April and 23 May 1917, to coincide with Nivelle's offensive on the Aisne. The British attacked around Lake Doiran at a cost of 5,000 dead and seriously wounded, one quarter of all British casualties throughout the entire Salonika Campaign. Another British attack in the Struma Valley was more successful, although in the centre of the line the French offensive under Grossetti, launched from Monastir on 9 May, failed amidst disease and logistical failures (severe penalties were inflicted on those caught scrounging food). Sarrail's "Spring Offensive in the Orient" had incurred 14,000 casualties for little gain.

Morale suffered badly and friction broke out amidst the different Allied nationalities, with troops having had no home leave in a year, or nearly two in the case of men who had been at the Dardanelles. Unlike the concurrent mutinies in France, those in this theatre were led by French NCOs. There were no executions, and leaves were granted as a concession, although some ringleaders were sentenced to prison and forced labour. In May the Allied governments authorised Jonnart, French High Commissioner, to remove King Constantine. On 11 June a stronger Allied naval force, accompanied by 13,000 troops, forced King Constantine's abdication in favour of his son, whilst Sarrail sent a division into Salonika. Venizelos became Prime Minister again and declared war on the Central Powers at the end of June.

Sarrail launched another offensive, this time into Albania, between 27 August and 25 October. In September 1917 he ordered a small force to take Pogradec, and recognised the former Turkish general Essad Bey Pasha, seen as little more than a bandit, as "President of the Provisional Albanian Government". He had thus infuriated Italy (who saw Albania as her sphere of influence, and lobbied Paris to have the incursion stopped), Serbia, whose Prime Minister Pasic came to Sarrail's headquarters to complain, and Greece, whose Prime Minister Venizelos complained to the Supreme War Council about Sarrail. In September Regnault replaced Grossetti in command of the French troops under Sarrail, and was then in turn succeeded by Henrys.

==== Dismissal ====
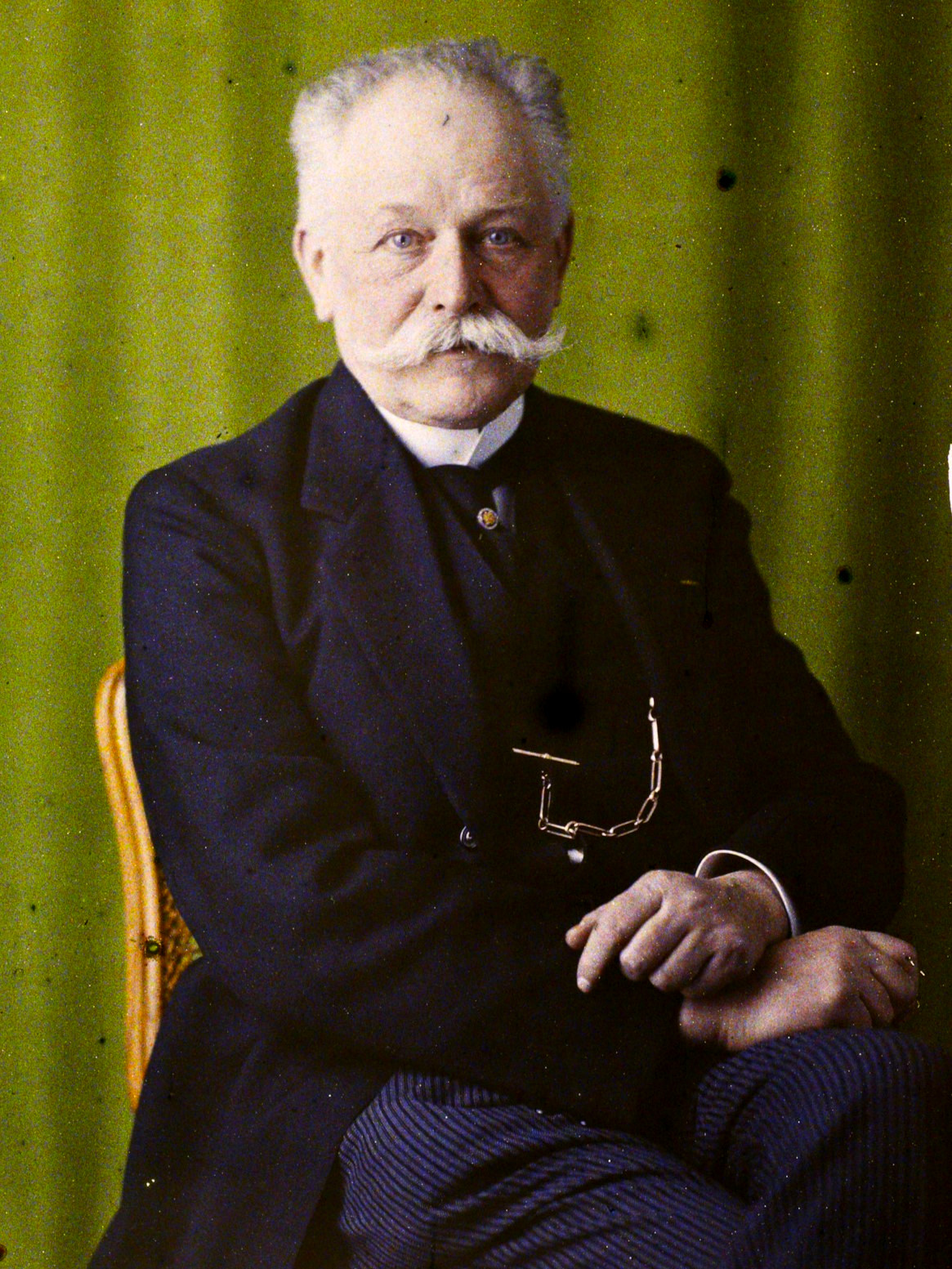
Autochrome portrait by Auguste Léon, 1921

With France narrowly surviving political and military crisis in 1917, Sarrail's association with the socialist politicians Caillaux and Malvy, now suspected of treasonable contacts with the Germans, sealed his fate.

On becoming Prime Minister Clemenceau moved quickly to sack Sarrail. He made Salonika the main topic of discussion at the first meeting of the War Committee (6 December), saying "Sarrail cannot remain there". Clemenceau and Philippe Petain (Commander-in-Chief of French forces on the Western Front) preferred Franchet d’Esperey as Sarrail's successor, but Foch (Chief of Staff) argued for Guillaumat to be given the job, and first Petain and then the Prime Minister were persuaded. Clemenceau informed Sarrail of his dismissal on 10 December.

A press release on 11 December announced that Sarrail "has had to contend with great difficulties and has rendered great services". There were no political consequences from his dismissal, and he took no further part in the war.

He participated in the political cabal against General Joffre which led to his fall in December 1917. A controversial general officer of limited competence, he moved to the reserve on 6 April 1918 for the remainder of the war.

=== Later career ===
Sarrail went into retirement at his country home at Montauban to write his memoirs. This account of the Salonika operations was published soon after the end of World War I under the title Mon Commandement en Orient.

When his political allies returned to power in 1924 he was despatched to Syria as high commissioner. The French right criticized his appointment. Sarrail promised free elections and said that political parties were allowed to form. However, he had no intention to follow these promises and instead sought to lure Druze chiefs, arrest them and exile them. He was recalled on 30 October 1925, after he ordered the shelling of Damascus during the Great Syrian Revolt. The shelling of Damascus prompted international outrage and condemnation.

He was fired because of his violent repression of the Druze revolt. He is responsible for the deaths of 10,000 Syrians, mostly civilians, and 2,500 to 6,000 French soldiers.

He became a Grand Officer of the Legion of Honour in November 1914 and was awarded a Grand Cross of the same Order in January 1916. He was given the Médaille militaire in September 1917. Serbia awarded him Order of Karađorđe's Star with swords and Order of the White Eagle.

He died on 23 March 1929 in Paris, a few days after Marshal Foch. Two mountain peaks in the Canadian Rockies were named in their honor, Mount Sarrail and Mount Foch stand side by side.

== Bibliography ==
- Cassar, George H. (2011). Lloyd George at War, 1916–18. Anthem Press, London. ISBN 978-0-857-28392-4.
- Clayton, Anthony (2003). Paths of Glory. Cassell, London. ISBN 0-304-35949-1.
- DiNardo, Richard L. (2015). Invasion: The Conquest of Serbia, 1915. Santa Barbara: Praeger. ISBN 9781440800924.
- Doughty, Robert A. (2005). Pyrrhic Victory. Harvard University Press. ISBN 978-0-674-02726-8.
- Greenhalgh, Elizabeth (2005). Victory Through Coalition. Cambridge University Press. ISBN 978-0-521-09629-4.
- Haythornthwaite, Philip J. (1994). The World War One Sourcebook. Arms and Armour Press, London. ISBN 1-85409-102-6
- Herwig, Holger (2009). The Marne. Random House. ISBN 978-0-8129-7829-2.
- Palmer, Alan (1998). Victory 1918. Weidenfeld & Nicolson. ISBN 0-297-84124-6.
- Prete, Roy (2009). Strategy And Command, 1914. McGill-Queen's University Press. ISBN 978-0-7735-3522-0.
- Sumner, Ian (2012). They Shall Not Pass: The French Army on the Western Front 1914–1918. Pen & Sword. ISBN 978-1-848-84209-0.
- Tuchman, Barbara (1962). August 1914. Constable & Co.
