= Fernand de Langle de Cary =

French military officer

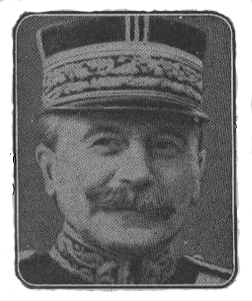
- Born: 4 July 1849; Lorient, France
- Died: 19 February 1927 (aged 77); Pont-Scorff, France
- Military career
- Allegiance: France
- Branch: French Army
- Service years: 1869–1916
- Rank: Général de division
- Commands: Fourth Army
- Conflicts: Franco-Prussian War; World War I
- Awards: Grand Cross of the Legion of Honor; Croix de guerre 1914-1918

Fernand Louis Armand Marie de Langle de Cary (4 July 1849 – 19 February 1927) was a French general during World War I. He commanded the Fourth Army when the war began.

== Early life ==
Fernand Louis Armand Marie De Langle De Cary (1849-1927) was born at Lorient July 4, 1849, entered the St. Cyr military school in 1867 and left at the head of his class in 1869, being commissioned to the Chasseurs d'Afrique. He participated in the Franco-Prussian War, during which he was wounded and given a medal for bravery. After the war he received army staff training and served for a time as a professor at the French military academy. He was promoted to brigadier general in 1900 and given the command of a cavalry brigade in Algeria.In 1912, he was made a member of the Conseil Supérieur de la Guerre which carried with it the command of an army in war.

== World War I ==
=== Commands ===
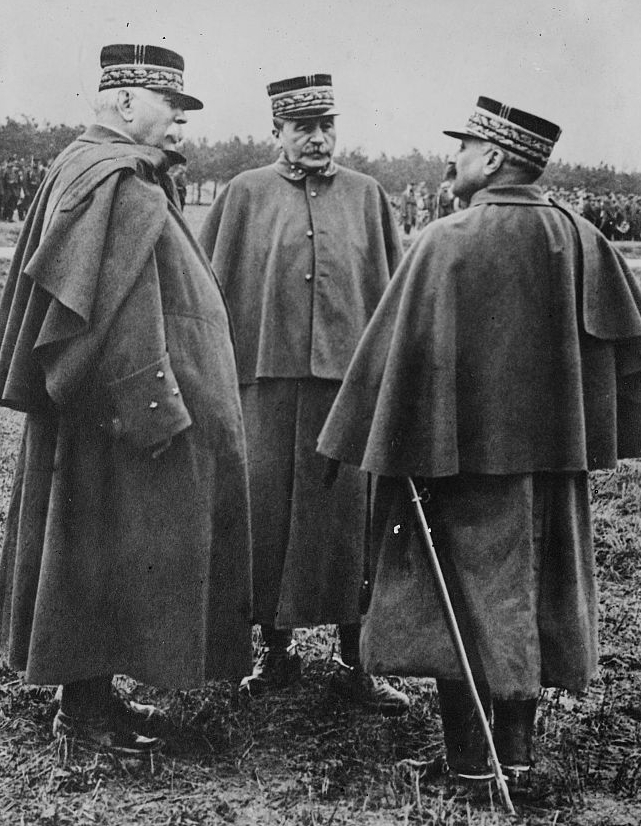
Fernand de Langle de Cary with Joseph Joffre (left) and Adolphe Guillaumat (right).

At the outbreak of World War I in August 1914, de Langle de Cary was placed in command of the Fourth Army. In concert with General Pierre Ruffey and his Third Army and General Charles Lanrezac and his Fifth Army, he was ordered by Joseph Joffre to attack the Germans advancing south through the heavily forested and ravined Ardennes. They were badly outnumbered by the Germans facing them attacking from above and were defeated with very heavy losses in the Battle of the Ardennes but managed to withdraw and form a line of defense strong enough to halt the German counter-offensive. Unlike Ruffey and Lanrezac, Langle de Cary was not relieved of his command. He continued at the head of the Fourth Army (though its strength was greatly reduced for the benefit of Ferdinand Foch's newly created Sixth Army) in the Marne and Aisne operations and in the trench warfare fighting of 1915. He commanded the French forces in the Second Battle of Champagne, another failed and costly French offensive ordered by Joffre.

=== Verdun blame and forced retirement ===
Nevertheless, de Langle de Cary replaced Edouard de Curieres de Castelnau as commander of the Central Army Group in December, 1915, when Castelnau was promoted to be Joffre's second-in-command. In this capacity, de Langle de Cary became responsible, among other duties, for overseeing the defensive readiness of Verdun. The German attack erupted onto Verdun in February, 1916, and the fears that he had expressed earlier about conditions there proved to be only too well founded, thus the army command was radically reorganized by Joffre who wanted more aggressive commanders, and Langle was replaced by Philippe Pétain, officially on grounds of his age, 66 (the official retirement age being 65). He had only been in command two months.

Romania entered the war on the side of the Allies in August 1916. De Langle de Cary was Joffre's first choice to head the French military mission there, but the suggestion was rejected by the French Minister there, Charles de Saint Aulaire. Instead, Henri Mathias Berthelot was appointed.

De Langle de Cary was retired (removed from the officer Active List) the following year. He died on 19 February 1927.

== Books ==
- Greenhalgh, Elizabeth (2014). The French Army and the First World War. Cambridge University Press. ISBN 978-1-107-60568-8.
