= Victor Cordonnier =

French Army general (1858-1936)

General Victor Cordonnier
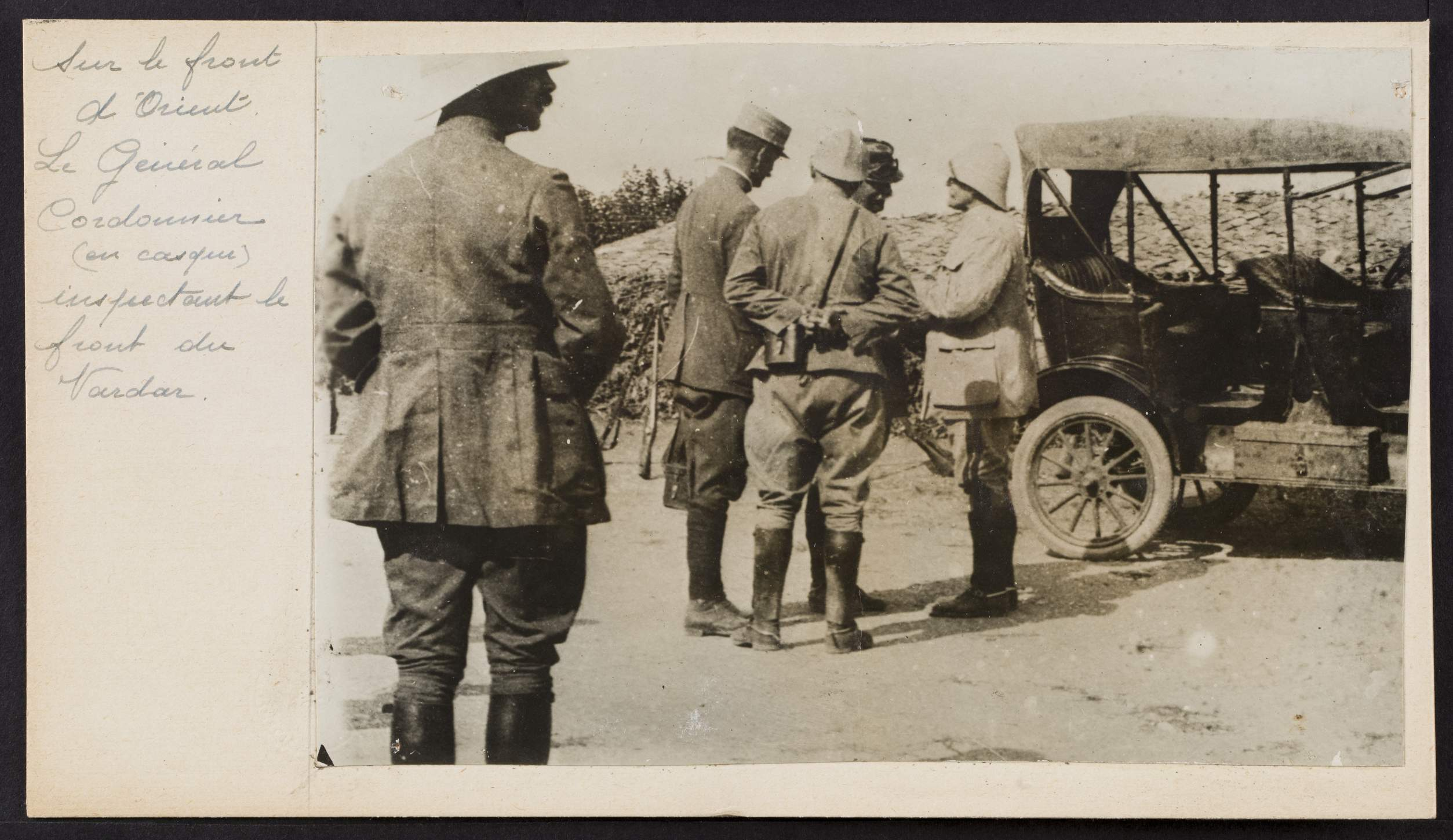
- General Cordonnier inspecting Vardar front, Macedonia
- Born: 23 March 1858; Surgy, France
- Died: 1936 (aged 77–78)
- Allegiance: France
- Branch: French Army
- Service years: 1879–1918
- Rank: Brigadier General
- Commands: Cadet Battalion, St. Cyr; 87th Brigade; 3rd Division; Army of the Orient
- Conflicts: World War I: Battle of the Frontiers; Battle of the Ardennes; Battle of the Marne; Macedonian front
- Awards: Commander of the Légion d'honneur
- Other work: Les Japonais des Mandchourie; Une Brigade au feu:Potins de Guerre

Victor Louis Émilien Cordonnier (23 March 1858, Surgy, France – 1936) served France during World War I as a general and was called "one of France's finest generals" by Geoffrey Blainey.

== Biography ==
=== Earlier career ===
After finishing his training at the military academy of St. Cyr in 1879, he was assigned as a sub-lieutenant in the infantry. He graduated from the École de Guerre eight years later. He alternated between staff and regimental service, serving in Algeria and the Alps. In 1905, he was chosen to be an instructor at École de Guerre, after serving as director of studies and commander of the cadet battalion at St. Cyr. During this time he wrote Les Japonais des Mandchourie (The Japanese in Manchuria), which soon became known as an important critical work on the Russo-Japanese War and was translated into several languages (English translation: Part I, 1912; Part II, 1914). In 1910, he was promoted to colonel and was given the command of an infantry regiment.

=== World War I ===
In 1913, he was given command of the new 87th Brigade and made general of brigade. His brigade distinguished itself at the battle of the Mangiennes, 10 August 1914 and the battle of the Ardennes. He directed the 3rd Division at the battle of the Marne, the advance to Sainte-Menehould and the Argonne, being wounded on 15 September 1914.

By December 1914, after being made an officer of the Legion of Honour, he led his division in bitter trench warfare in the Argonne, later being in command of a group of divisions at Alsace in January 1914.

He was made a commander in the Legion of Honour and in July 1916 was given command of the French troops of the Salonika armies under Maurice Sarrail, later referred to as Army of the Orient. Commanding the left wing of the Entente's autumn offensive, he saw action at Ostrovo, Florina, Armenohor and Kenali. However, his and Sarrail's differences led him to be reassigned.

=== Post war ===
After arriving back in France, Cordonnier, being terribly ill, was taken to hospital and underwent surgery for cancer. He was unable to return to active duty due to his health and instead went into retirement. In 1921, he published Une Brigade au feu; Potins de Guerre, a tribute to the 87th brigade which he commanded.

== His works ==
- Les Japonais des Mandchourie (The Japanese in Manchuria; vol. 1, 1904) at Google Books
- Une Brigade au feu; Potins de Guerre at Google Books
- Ai-je trahi Sarrail ? sur Gallica, 1930
