= Battle of St. Quentin (1914) =

Battle during the First World War

Battle of St Quentin/Battle of Guise
- Part of The Great Retreat on the Western Front, during the First World War
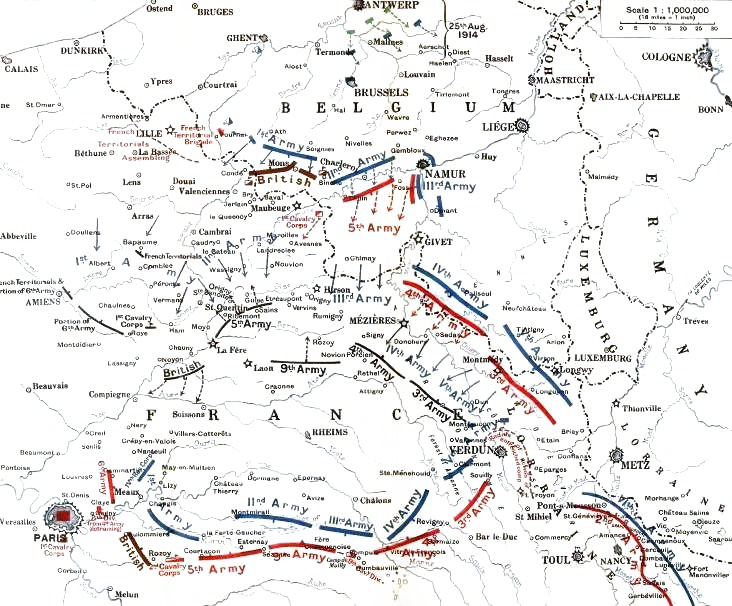
- German and Allied positions, 23 August – 5 September 1914
Date	29–30 August 1914
Location	Guise, France 49°54′03″N 3°37′42″E
Result	French victory

Belligerents
France	German Empire

Commanders and leaders
Charles Lanrezac	Karl von Bülow

Strength
Fifth Army	2nd Army

Casualties and losses
10,000 casualties	7,000 casualties

The Battle of St. Quentin (also called the First Battle of Guise, French: 1ere Bataille de Guise) was fought from 29 to 30 August 1914, during the First World War.

== Battle ==
On the night of 26 August 1914, the Allies withdrew from Le Cateau to St. Quentin. With retreat all along the line, the commander-in-chief of the French forces, Joseph Joffre, needed the Fifth Army (General Charles Lanrezac) to hold off the German advance with a counter-attack, despite a 4 mi (6.4 km) separation from the French Fourth Army on the right flank and the continual retreat of the British Expeditionary Force (BEF) on the left flank. The movement of the Fifth Army took most of 28 August, turning from facing north to facing west against St. Quentin.

On 29 August the Fifth Army attacked St. Quentin with their full force. The Germans captured orders from a French officer and General Karl von Bülow, commander of the German 2nd Army had time to prepare. The attacks against the town by the XVIII corps was a costly failure but X and III corps on the right were rallied by the commander of I Corps, General Louis Franchet d'Esperey. Advances on the right were made against Guise and forced the Germans, including the Guard Corps, to fall back.

That night, Joffre ordered Lanrezac to resume his retreat and destroy the bridges over the Oise as he fell back. The orders did not reach the Fifth Army until the morning of 30 August, and the retreat began several hours late. The move went unchallenged by the 2nd Army, which neither attacked nor pursued.

Bülow found that the 2nd Army was separated by the Oise, which offered the possibility of enveloping the French attack with counter-attacks from both flanks. The risk that the French could exploit the 15 km (9.3 mi) gap between the inner flanks of the 2nd Army, led Bülow to choose a cautious policy of preventing the danger and ordered the corps on the inner flanks to close up and counter-attack the French X Corps. Later in the afternoon French attacks were repulsed and the 14th Division was ordered to advance from the Somme area to intervene in the battle. The divisional commander ignored the order to let the division rest and prepare for an advance on La Fère to get behind the Fifth Army. Lieutenant-General Karl von Einem the VII Corps commander was overruled and all corps of the 2nd Army were ordered to attack and obtain a decisive victory. Bülow reported the battle to Oberste Heeresleitung (OHL, supreme command of the German armies) by wireless as a victory but during the night, captured documents revealed that thirteen French divisions had attacked 6½ German divisions. Bülow sent a staff officer to the 1st Army (General Alexander von Kluck), to request support for the attack on 30 August. Doubts emerged that the Guard Corps could attack in the morning due to exhaustion and the commander was authorised to withdraw behind the Oise if necessary; the possibility of enveloping the French left flank had passed and operations for local advantage were ordered for the morning.

Monument to the Fifth Army at Guise

The French resumed the offensive on the morning of 30 August but managed only disjointed attacks which were repulsed; German counter-attacks began before noon. The terrain in the Oise valley was marshy, cut by deep streams and covered by underbrush, with rising ground beyond. German infantry made slow progress through extensive artillery bombardments by both sides. By early afternoon, aircraft reconnaissance reports showed that the French had begun to withdraw behind rearguards. Bülow ordered a pursuit by small infantry parties with field artillery, while the main force paused to rest, due to exhaustion and to concern that the fortress of La Fère obstructed a general advance and would have to be masked while the 1st Army enveloped the French from the west and then attacked on 1 September. The 2nd Army pursuit by small forces took only four guns, 16 machine-guns and c. 1,700 prisoners.
