= Charles-Marie Condé =

French soldier

Charles-Marie Condé (25 February 1876 in Saint-Omer (Pas-de-Calais) – 13 October 1945) was a French military officer.

In World War II he was a general, and from 2 September 1939 to 20 June 1940, he commanded the 3rd French Army against the German invasion of France.
Between 17 and 20 June, he was also in command of the 2nd Army Group .

He was a prisoner of war between 20 June 1940 and 11 May 1945.

== Sources ==
- Generals of World War II
- Wikimaginot
