= Battle of the Ardennes =

August 1914 early battle of World War I on the Franco-Belgian frontier

Coordinates: 50°15′N 5°40′E

- Part of the Battle of the Frontiers on the Western Front of the First World War
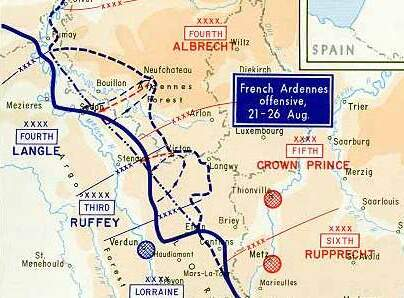
- Battle of the Ardennes, 1914
Date	21–23 August 1914
Location	Ardennes region, Belgian–French frontier
Result	German victory

Belligerents
France	Germany

Commanders and leaders
Pierre Ruffey; Fernand de Langle de Cary	Albrecht, Duke of Württemberg; Crown Prince Wilhelm of Germany

Strength
Third Army; Fourth Army	4th Army; 5th Army

Casualties and losses
42,557	14,940
- Ardennes in Belgium

The Battle of the Ardennes took place during the First World War fought on the frontiers of France, Germany, Belgium and Luxembourg from 21 to 23 August 1914. The German Empire defeated the Third French Republic and forced a French retreat. The battle was part of the larger Battle of the Frontiers, the first battle of the Western Front.

== Background ==
=== Belgium ===
Belgian military planning was based on an assumption that other powers would expel an invader but the likelihood of a German invasion did not lead to France and Britain being seen as allies or for the Belgian government intending to do more than protect its independence. The Anglo-French Entente (1904) had led the Belgian government to think that the British attitude to Belgium was that it had come to be seen as a protectorate. A Belgian General Staff was formed in 1910 but the Chef d'État-Major Général de l'Armée, Lieutenant-Général Harry Jungbluth was retired on 30 June 1912 and only replaced in May 1914 by Lieutenant-General Chevalier Antonin de Selliers de Moranville, who began work on a contingency plan for the concentration of the army and also met railway officials on 29 July.

Belgian troops were to be massed in central Belgium, in front of the National redoubt of Belgium ready to face any border, while the Fortified Position of Liège and Fortified Position of Namur were left to secure the frontiers. On mobilisation, the King became Commander-in-Chief and chose where the army was to concentrate. Amid the disruption of the new rearmament plan the disorganised and poorly trained Belgian soldiers would benefit from a central position to delay contact with an invader but it would also need fortifications for defence, which were on the frontier. A school of thought wanted a return to a frontier deployment in line with French theories of the offensive. Belgian plans became a compromise in which the field army concentrated behind the river Gete with two divisions forward at Liège and Namur.

=== Schlieffen–Moltke Plan ===
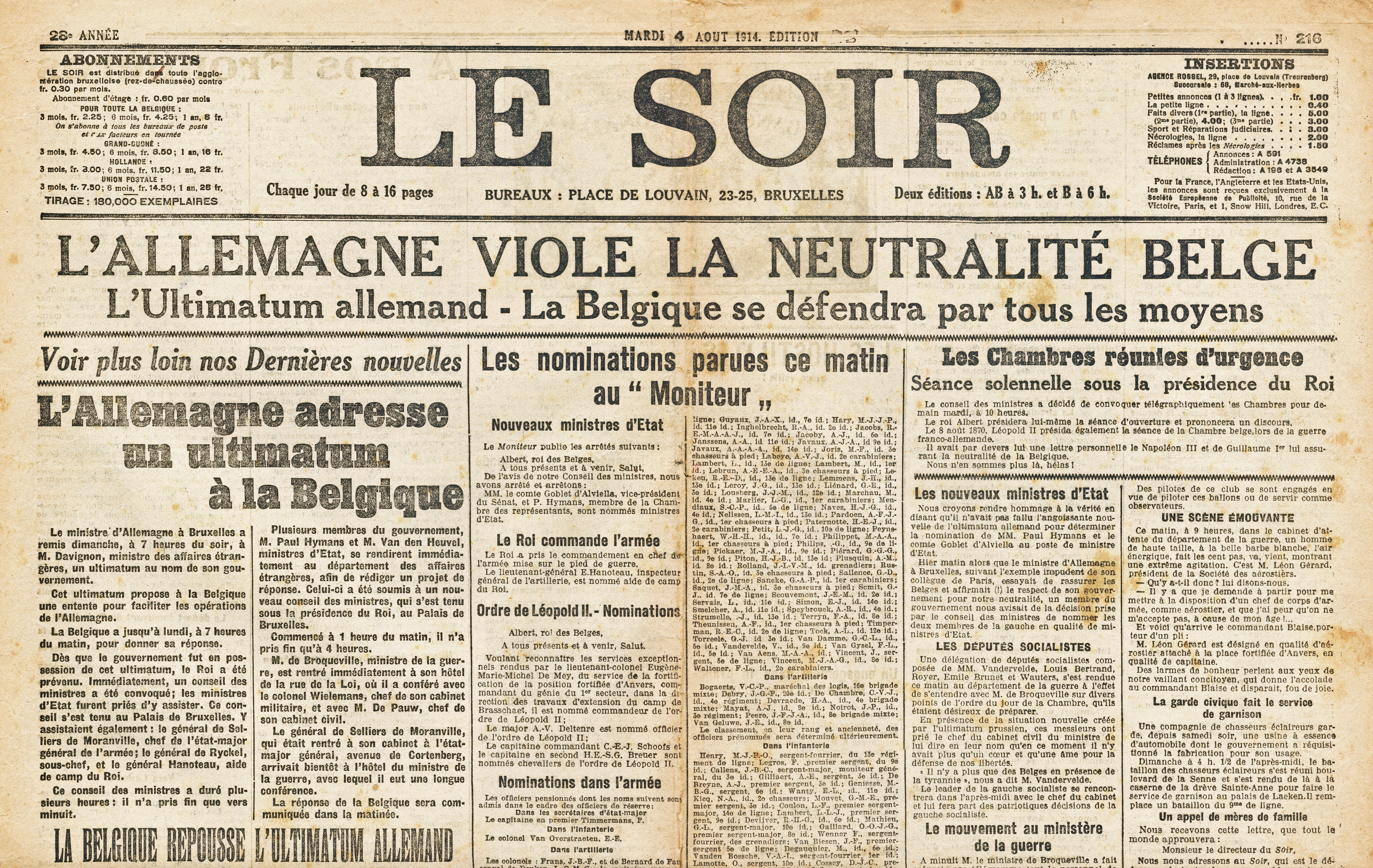
Headline in Le Soir, 4 August 1914

Field marshal Alfred Graf von Schlieffen was Chief of the German General Staff (Oberste Heeresleitung, OHL) from 1891 until his retirement in 1906. (Note: Graf (Count) is a German title of nobility.) A student of Carl von Clausewitz, like other Prussian officers, he had been taught that "the heart of France lies between Paris and Brussels". In 1839, the Treaty of London masterminded by the British diplomat Lord Palmerston was signed by France, Prussia, Russia, Austria and the United Kingdom creating the independent Kingdom of Belgium. France and Russia joined in a military alliance in 1892, which threatened Germany with the possibility of a war on two fronts. German strategy gave priority to an offensive operation against France and a strategic defensive against Russia. Planning would be determined by numerical inferiority, speed of mobilisation, concentration and the effect of modern weaponry. The Germans expected frontal attacks to be costly and protracted, leading to limited success, particularly after the French and Russians modernised the fortifications on their frontiers with Germany. To evade the fortified frontier with France, Schlieffen devised a plan that by 1898–99 envisioned German forces rapidly passing between Antwerp and Namur to take Paris from the north, inflicting a quick and decisive defeat on France.

The German left flank in occupied Alsace would tempt the French into attacking there, drawing the French forces away from Paris and the German right. In its 1906 version, the Schlieffen Plan allocated six weeks and seven eighths of the Imperial German Army (a force of 1.5 million men) to overwhelm France while the remainder fought against the Russian Army in East Prussia. Helmuth von Moltke the Younger succeeded Schlieffen in 1906 and was less certain that the French would conform to German assumptions. Moltke adapted the deployment and concentration plan to accommodate an attack in the centre or an enveloping attack from both flanks as variants to the plan, by adding divisions to the left flank opposite the French frontier, from the c. 1,700,000 men expected to be mobilised in the Westheer (western army). The main German force would still advance through Belgium and attack southwards into France, the French armies would be enveloped on the left and pressed back over the Meuse, Aisne, Somme, Oise, Marne and Seine, unable to withdraw into central France. The French would either be annihilated or the manoeuvre from the north would create conditions for victory in the centre or in Lorraine on the common border. Moltke planned for a force of about 320,000 men to defend Alsace-Lorraine south of Metz, 400,000 men to invade France and Luxembourg through the Ardennes and 700,000 more troops to invade Belgium.

=== Plan XVII ===
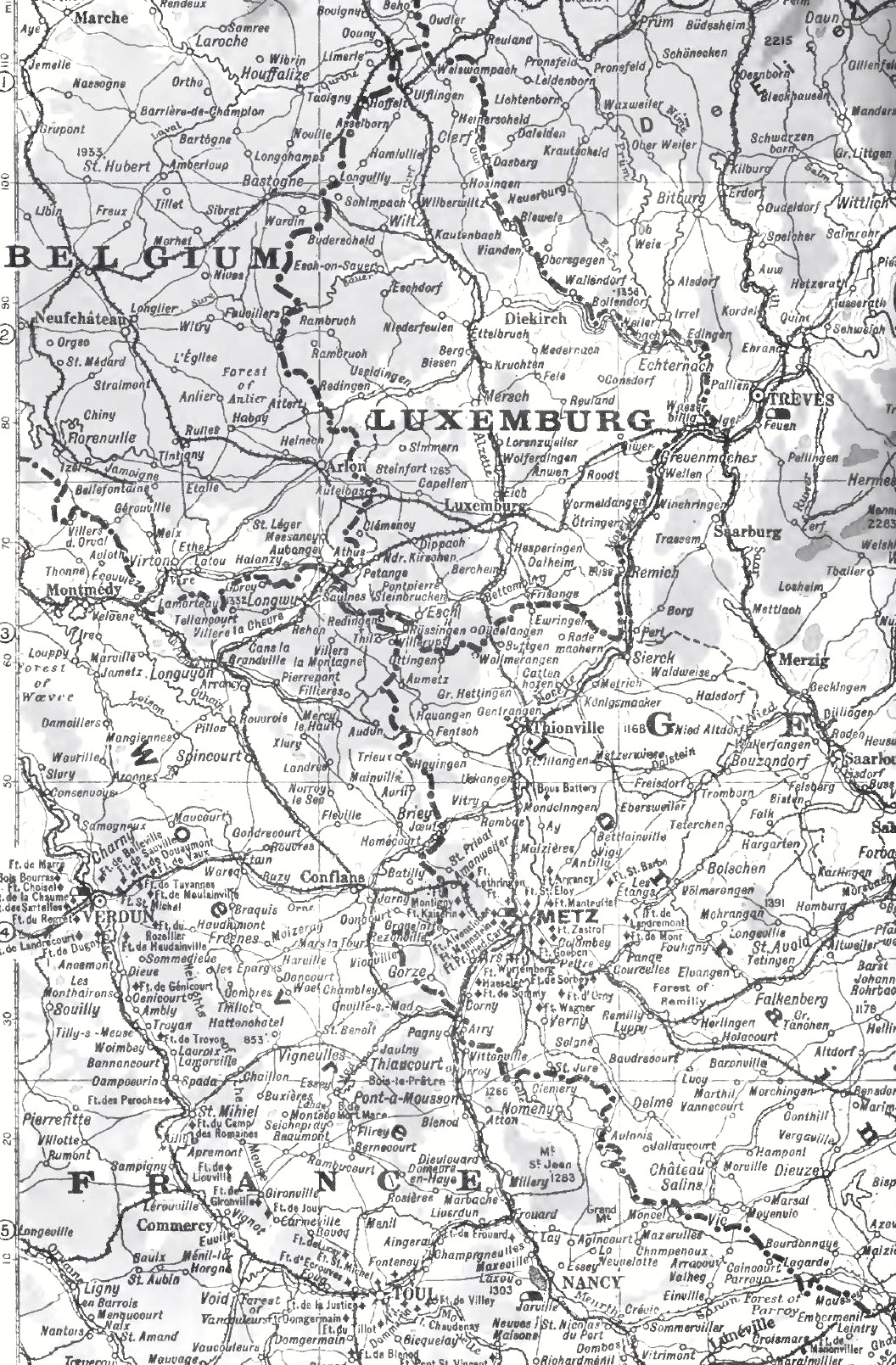
Franco-German border, 1914

After the defeat in the Franco-Prussian War, France had been humiliated, forced to pay the French indemnity of five billion francs and lost the provinces of Alsace and Lorraine to the new German Empire, so as to permanently put France on the defensive. The French fortified the common border but after 30 years the French felt confident enough to plan for an offensive strategy, thanks in no small part to Ferdinand Foch. France had a population and birth rate smaller than those of Germany and invented the concept of élan vital and decided on a strategy of "offensive to the limit", making the will to fight the cornerstone of French military planning. Colonel Louis Loyzeau de Grandmaison, took up Foch's doctrine and delivered two speeches before the École Militaire that set the foundations of Plan XVII, which was formally adopted in May 1913. French strategists took account of the possibility of envelopment by the German right and calculated that the more powerful the German right, the weaker the center and left would be. The French decided to concentrate their forces on the Rhine, planning to break the German left and center on either side of Metz, to cut off the German right and defeat the German armies in detail. (Note: Barbara Tuchman's work The Guns of August records a visit made in 1913 by the military governor of Lille, one General Lebras, to General de Castelnau, the Deputy Chief of the French General Staff, to dissuade him from revoking Lille's status as a fortress city. Lebas argued that Lille, 10 mi (16 km) from the Belgian border and 40 mi (64 km) inland from the English Channel, would be in the path of any enemy army moving through Flanders into France. Castelnau disagreed and explained the distance between the German border and Lille was too vast for a decisive German offensive.)

Under Plan XVII, the French peacetime army was to form five field armies of about two million men, with groups of Reserve divisions attached to each army and a group of reserve divisions on the flanks. The armies were to concentrate opposite the German frontier around Épinal, Nancy and Verdun–Mezières, with an army in reserve around Ste. Ménéhould and Commercy. Since 1871, railway building had given the French General staff sixteen lines to the German frontier against thirteen available to the German army and the French could afford to wait until German intentions were clear. The French deployment was intended to be ready for a German offensive in Lorraine or through Belgium. The French expected that the Germans would use reserve troops but also assumed that a large German army would be mobilised on the border with Russia, leaving the western army with sufficient troops only to advance through Belgium, south of the rivers Meuse and Sambre. French intelligence had obtained a 1905 map exercise by the German general staff, in which German troops had gone no further north than Namur and assumed that plans to besiege Belgian forts were a defensive measure against the Belgian army.

A German attack from south-eastern Belgium towards Mézières and a possible offensive from Lorraine towards Verdun, Nancy and St. Dié was anticipated; the plan was a development of Plan XVI and made more provision for the possibility of a German offensive through Belgium. The First, Second and Third armies were to concentrate between Épinal and Verdun opposite Alsace and Lorraine, the Fifth Army was to assemble from Montmédy to Sedan and Mézières and the Fourth Army was to be held back west of Verdun, ready to move east to attack the southern flank of a German invasion through Belgium or south against the northern flank of an attack through Lorraine. No formal provision was made for joint operations with the British Expeditionary Force (BEF) but discreet arrangements had been made between the French and British general staffs; during the Second Moroccan Crisis in 1911, the French had been told that six British divisions could be expected to operate around Maubeuge.

=== Declarations of war ===
At midnight on 31 July/1 August, the German government sent an ultimatum to Russia and announced a state of Kriegsgefahr (threat of war) during the day; the Turkish government ordered mobilisation and the London Stock Exchange closed. On 1 August, the British government ordered the mobilisation of the navy, the German government ordered general mobilisation and declared war on Russia. Hostilities commenced on the Polish frontier, the French government ordered general mobilisation and next day the German government sent an ultimatum to Belgium, demanding passage through Belgian territory and German troops crossed the frontier of Luxembourg. Military operations began on the French frontier, Libau was bombarded by the German light cruiser SMS Augsburg and the British government guaranteed naval protection for French coasts. On 3 August, the Belgian Government refused German demands and the British Government guaranteed military support to Belgium, should Germany invade. Germany declared war on France, the British government ordered general mobilisation and Italy declared neutrality. On 4 August, the British government sent an ultimatum to Germany which expired at midnight on 4–5 August, Central European Time. Belgium severed diplomatic relations with Germany and Germany declared war on Belgium. German troops crossed the Belgian frontier and attacked Liège.

== Prelude ==
=== French preparations ===
French commander-in-chief Joseph Joffre ordered an attack through the Ardennes forest in support of the French invasion of Lorraine. According to the pre-war French war strategy document, Plan XVII, German forces in the area were only expected to be light, with French light, rapid-firing artillery proving advantageous in a wooded terrain such as that found in the Ardennes. By 20 August, however, it was becoming clear, first to the Fifth Army (General Charles Lanrezac) and then to Commander-in-Chief Joseph Joffre, that a large German force was gathering in the area. That day the Germans launched a counter-attack against the French advance into Lorraine. Even so, Joffre ordered an invasion of the Ardennes on 20 August for the following day.

== Battle ==
Joffre issued instructions on 18 August but held back the Third and Fourth armies because air and cavalry reconnaissance found few German troops opposite the two armies, only a large force moving north-west 25–31 mi (40–50 km) away. On 19 August the Fourth Army (General Fernand de Langle de Cary) was ordered to occupy the bridges over the Semois but not to advance into Belgium until the German offensive began. A premature attack would advance into a trap rather than give time for the Germans to empty Luxembourg of troops before the French advanced. On 20 August the German armies in the south attacked the French First and Second armies and next day the Third and Fourth armies began their offensive. The Fourth Army crossed the Semois and advanced towards Neufchâteau and the Third Army (General Pierre Ruffey) attacked towards Arlon, as a right flank guard for the Fourth army. South of Verdun, the Third army was renamed Army of Lorraine and was to watch for a German offensive from Metz, which left the remainder of the Third Army free to concentrate on the offensive into Belgium. The French armies invaded Belgium with nine infantry corps but ten German corps and six reserve brigades of the 4th and 5th armies lay between Metz and the north of Luxembourg.

The German 4th Army (Albrecht, Duke of Württemberg) and 5th Army (Crown Prince Wilhelm) had moved slower than the 1st, 2nd and 3rd armies and the French advance towards them was reported on 21 August. The French armies had few maps and were unaware of the size of the German force opposite, as the Third Army brushed aside small German detachments. On 22 August in the Third army area, V Corps attacked dug-in German troops at Longwy at 5:00 a.m. in thick fog and heavy rain, with no artillery support. As the fog lifted, German artillery caught the French guns in the open and silenced them. A German counter-attack routed a French division and the corps was not rallied until the evening. To the north the IV Corps also advanced in fog, encountered German troops dug in near Virton and was forced back also with a division routed. On the southern Flank, VI Corps was pushed back a short distance. In the Fourth Army area the II Corps on the right flank managed to keep level with the Third Army to the south but was not able to advance further. The Colonial Corps on the left was defeated at the Battle of Rossignol, 9.3 mi (15 km) south of Neufchâteau and suffered 11,646 casualties but the 5th Colonial Brigade on the left easily reached Neufchâteau before being repulsed with many casualties. Further north XII Corps advanced steadily but the XVII Corps beyond was outflanked and the 33rd Division lost most of its artillery. On the northern flank the XI and IX corps were not seriously engaged.

== Aftermath ==
=== Analysis ===
Charbonneau explained that the defeat of the Colonial Corps was caused by faulty reconnaissance, the ineffectiveness of advanced guards in causing delay to advancing German units and that French offensive tactics neglected the importance of obtaining a superiority of fire, which had led to reckless attacks. The quality of the German opponents was not mentioned but German reconnaissance had been effective, communication between commanders and subordinates had not broken down, mutual support between neighbouring units had occurred and German artillery had provided continuous close fire support. At Neufchâteau, the French colonial infantry had been out-gunned and outnumbered by German units, which had been able to engage all their forces quickly. The French XII Corps had a greater number of guns but was not able to overcome two German infantry battalions. German artillery had engaged the Colonial Brigade from close range but when in a hastily occupied defensive position, the French had nullified much of the German artillery-fire; French troops caught in the open had been annihilated. Both sides had attempted to gain fire superiority before advancing and once this had been achieved by the Germans, they had been able to manoeuvre without severe casualties.

The French commanders were ordered by Joffre to continue the offensive on 23 August as early as possible, since his strategy depended on the success of the Third and Fourth armies. Ruffey replied in the morning that the attack could not begin until his divisions had reorganised and in the early afternoon found that the Germans had forestalled another advance, by pushing the V Corps in the centre back for 5.0 mi (8 km), which led to the rest of the army falling back level. In the Fourth Army area, the 33rd Division of XVII Corps was routed and the rest of the corps had retired during the night of 22/23 August. The 5th Colonial Brigade withdrew from Neufchâteau before dawn on 23 August, exposing the right flank of XII Corps, which also fell back. By the end of 23 August, the survivors of the Third and Fourth armies were back to their jumping-off positions except for the XI and IX corps on the northern flank.

=== Casualties ===
At Rossignol German casualties were c. 1,318 and French casualties c. 11,277 men. The French 4th Division had c. 1,195 casualties at Bellefontaine against c. 1,920 German casualties. At Neufchâteau the 5th Colonial Brigade had c. 3,600 casualties against units of the German XVIII Reserve Corps, which suffered c. 1,800 casualties. At Bertrix the artillery of the 33rd Division was destroyed and c. 3,181 casualties suffered against c. ⅓ of the number of German casualties, which were noted to be greater than all of the casualties in the Franco-Prussian War. At Massin-Anloy, the French 22nd Division and 34th Division lost 2,240 men killed and the 34th Division was routed. German casualties in the 25th Division were c. 3,224, of whom 1,100 men were killed. At Virton the French 8th Division was "destroyed" and the 3rd Division had c. 556 casualties; German losses were c. 1,281.

In the fighting around Éthe and Bleid, the French 7th Division lost 5,324 men and the German 10th Division suffered c. 1,872 casualties. At Longwy the French V Corps with the 9th and 10th divisions had c. 2,884 casualties and German units of the 26th Division had c. 1,242. South of Longwy, German casualties in the 9th and 12th Reserve and 33rd divisions were c. 4,458 men against the French 12th 40th and 42nd divisions, of which the 40th Division was routed. In 2009, Holger Herwig recorded 19,218 casualties from 21 to 31 August in the 4th Army and 19,017 casualties in the 5th Army. Herwig also recorded 5,500 casualties in the French 8th Division at Virton and wrote that at Ethe, the 7th Division had been "stomped". At Ochamps the 20th Infantry Regiment lost 1,300 men (50 per cent) and the 11th Infantry Regiment lost 2,700 of 3,300 men. The 5th Colonial Brigade lost 3,200 of 6,600 men.
