= Charles Lanrezac =

French general (1852–1925)

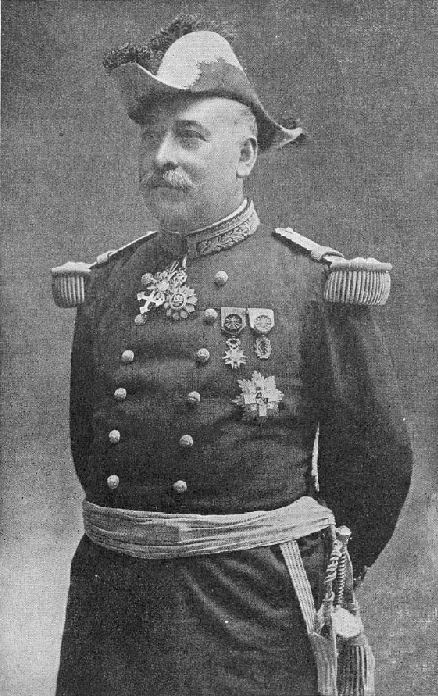
- Born: 31 July 1852; Pointe-à-Pitre, Guadeloupe
- Died: 18 January 1925 (aged 72); Neuilly-sur-Seine, France
- Military career
- Allegiance: France
- Service years: 1869–1914
- Rank: Général de Division
- Commands: 11th Army Corps; Fifth Army
- Conflicts: Franco-Prussian War; World War I
- Awards: Grand cross of the Légion d'honneur Grand cross of the Order of the Crown (Belgium)

Charles Lanrezac (31 July 1852 – 18 January 1925) was a Guadeloupean general, formerly a distinguished staff college lecturer, who briefly commanded the French Fifth Army at the outbreak of the First World War.

His army, originally intended to strike the Germans on their western flank, faced the brunt of the German march, stronger and further west than anticipated, through Belgium at the Battle of Charleroi. He was frustrated by the reluctance of his superior, General Joseph Joffre, who was initially preoccupied by French attacks into Lorraine and the Ardennes, to appreciate the danger of the German march through Belgium. Forced to retreat, at Joffre's insistence he made a successful counterattack at the Battle of Guise, but his apparent reluctance to counterattack led him to be relieved of command prior to the Battle of the Marne.

He is particularly remembered in British writing as his army fought on the right of the small British Expeditionary Force, with whose commander-in-chief, Sir John French, he had a poor relationship.

== Early life ==
Lanrezac was a Marquis, but did not use his title. He was of swarthy appearance (he had a "a dark creole face" in Barbara Tuchman's description) and was a native of Guadeloupe.

Lanrezac briefly attended the military school at Saint-Cyr in 1869 but when the Franco-Prussian War started in 1870, he was sent to fight as a lieutenant. He fought with the Armée de la Loire at Coulmiers and in the campaign around Orléans. In January 1871 he was transferred to the Armée de l'Est and following the failure of its campaign, he was interned in Switzerland. By 1876 he had been promoted to captain. He graduated from the École Militaire in 1879. During the following years Lanrezac served in various staff functions in the 113th Infantry Regiment and on a brigade staff in Tunisia. Lanrezac was promoted to colonel in 1902 and given command of the 119th Infantry Regiment. He became a brigadier-general in June 1906, commanding the 43rd Infantry Brigade stationed in Vannes. He served under Joffre with 6th Infantry Division and became Joffre's protégé. After this brigade command he was made a professor at the École Militaire. He was a brilliant lecturer, but caustic and ill-tempered. He became known as "the lion of the French Army". Lanrezac was an opponent of Foch's theories of offensive a l'outrance, writing that "if every subordinate commander has the right to ram home an attack on the first opponent he sees, the commander in chief is incapable of exercising any form of direction".

He was made a Général de Division in 1911 and Joffre, who thought him "a veritable lion", included him on the shortlist of three for Deputy Chief of the General Staff that year. In 1912 he was appointed to command of the 11th Army Corps in Nantes. Henry Wilson claimed – in an after dinner speech when he observed XX Corps manoeuvres in September 1913 – that Lanrezac had told him that he only knew the English phrases "Beautiful woman", "kiss me quick" and "beefsteak and potatoes", but that these were enough to travel the world.

== World War I ==
=== Concerns about left flank ===
In April 1914 Lanrezac succeeded Joseph Gallieni as a member of the French Supreme War Council and was designated as the commander of the Fifth Army in the event of war. He had the same doubts as Gallieni about Joffre's plans. Fifth Army, holding the extreme left of the French line, had to meet the enveloping right-wing of the German Army as it marched through Belgium, whilst co-operating with the allied British Expeditionary Force on his left flank. When given details of his portion of Plan XVII in May 1914, he was deeply concerned that the Germans would come in strength west of the Meuse. A letter which he wrote to the Governor of Maubeuge on 23 June suggests he thought the Germans would not come west of the River Sambre (i.e. that they would make a wider turning movement through Belgium than Joffre was assuming, but less so than they would actually attempt in the event). Historian Sewell Tyng later wrote that Lanrezac had "the gift of Cassandra".

Lanrezac warned on 31 July (just before mobilisation) that the Germans might come further west through Belgium, although he still thought Sedan their likely objective. His report of July 1914 warned that he had too few troops to advance into Belgium as planned, and cited a German wargame of 1911 which called for three German armies to march through Belgium. Lanrezac later claimed that Joffre paid no attention to his report, but the report did not in fact reach Joffre until 1 August, and Joffre later wrote that it would have been "premature" to discuss things with Lanrezac while the strategic situation was still unfolding. A fellow officer described the letter, which was to become a key source in the recrimination after the war, as being like a professor's critique of a B− thesis.

=== Advance into Belgium ===
Fifth Army contained I, II, III, X and XI Corps, the 4th Cavalry Division and two reserve divisions. Between 8 August—when Lanrezac sent his chief of staff General Hely d'Oissel to warn them—and 10 August, GQG scoffed at reports of strong German forces being spotted at Huy in Belgium, arguing that the Germans did not have enough troops for this to be likely and that the reconnaissance was unreliable.

Lanrezac was already sufficiently concerned (11 August) about the German movement into Belgium to obtain permission to deploy one of his corps at Givet on the Meuse. Liège fell on 12 August, on which day senior British generals were still arguing, in London, as to how far forward the BEF should be deployed. That same day Joffre ordered Lanrezac to move his left corps—Franchet d'Esperey's I Corps—up to Dinant.

Lanrezac visited his superior, General Joseph Joffre on 14 August, and begged him not to have Third and Fourth Armies attack into "that death trap of the Ardennes" and to be allowed to deploy his own army facing north rather than northeast, so as to face a German march westwards through Belgium. Joffre was pleased at the good progress which the French were making into Alsace-Lorraine, and unwilling to listen. Lanrezac later wrote that he had "left with death in my soul."

At 7pm on 15 August, after German cavalry had been spotted at Dinant on the Meuse, Lanrezac at last obtained permission to redeploy from opposite the Ardennes. On that day Joffre issued his Instruction Particuliere No 10, stating that the main German effort would come through Belgium. Lanrezac was ordered to deploy into the angle of the Rivers Sambre and the Meuse, requiring him to make a march of 120 kilometres in 5 days. He was also required to hand over command of Eydoux's XI Corps—men from Brittany—to Fourth Army in the Ardennes.

=== Meeting with Sir John French ===
The British liaison officer Edward Spears later wrote that Lanrezac's reputation as an academic lecturer made him "the star turn" of the French Army. The British commander Sir John French, at his meeting with Joffre on 16 August, was advised to hurry up and join in Lanrezac's offensive, as he would not wait for him to catch up. On 16 August, in exchange for the loss of XI Corps, Joffre transferred XVIII Corps to Lanrezac. Lanrezac received three reserve divisions, containing men from Bordeaux, Gascony and the Basque Country, and two extra divisions of French settlers from Algeria.

Spears described Lanrezac as "a big flabby man" with a habit of hitching his spectacles behind his ear, whilst Sir John, who disliked him, later described him as "a Staff College pedant" with no practical ability at command in war. Sir John had an infamous meeting with Lanrezac at Rethel (17 August), at which he attempted to speak in French, despite not being able to do so well. When he asked whether the Germans spotted at Huy were crossing the river, his attempt to pronounce the name "Huy" caused Lanrezac to exclaim in exasperation that the Germans had probably gone there to fish. Not only did they form a mutual dislike, but Sir John also believed Lanrezac was about to advance further, whereas in fact Lanrezac wanted to fall back from his strong position behind the angle of the Rivers Sambre and Meuse, but was forbidden to do so by Joffre. Concerned at having to guard against a German Meuse crossing south of Sedan, at Mezieres, or (most likely) at Namur north of Givet, Lanrezac urged that he be allowed to retreat to Maubeuge to avoid being flanked.

At the Rethel meeting on 17 August Lanrezac also thought that Sir John French, whose BEF only consisted of four infantry divisions rather than the planned six, intended to use the British cavalry on foot (it is thought likely that he had misunderstood Sir John's intention to keep his cavalry in reserve). Whereas Sir John wanted Sordet's French cavalry to cover the assembly of the BEF, Lanrezac wanted them to gather tactical intelligence and was told by Joffre's deputy chief of staff Berthelot on 17 August that this took priority. Nonetheless Joffre ordered Sordet to move up to Namur and Louvain to try to prevent the Belgians falling back on Antwerp. GQG were unfairly angered at Sordet's "dilatoriness", even though his horses were too tired to do more than walk. Lanrezac demanded to Joffre on morning of 18th that he have use of Sordet's corps.

Although Joffre was aware (18 August) that as many as fifteen German corps were moving through Belgium (in fact it was sixteen, and twenty-eight if the German Fourth and Fifth Armies in the centre are also included), he believed that only a few of these would come west of the Meuse, where he believed they could be held by the British and Belgians. French Third and Fourth Armies, on Lanrezac's right, were preparing to attack into the Ardennes in accordance with Plan XVII, and Joffre wanted Lanrezac's Fifth Army to attack the bulk of the German right wing on its west flank as—it was assumed—it attacked the left flank of French Fourth Army. Lanrezac, forbidden to retreat by Joffre, reported that he would be ready to attack by 20 August. Lanrezac began to move north on 19 August, leaving a gap between his army and Fourth Army on his right.

Joffre believed (20 August) that Liège was still holding out (in fact the last of the Liège forts had fallen on 16 August and by 20 August Brussels had fallen and the Belgians were falling back on Antwerp), and hoped that Lanrezac would be able to link up with Namur, which was expected to hold out for even longer. On 20 August Gallwitz persuaded von Bulow (commander, German Second Army) to attack Lanrezac to pin down his army and prevent him marching to the relief of Namur.

=== Battle of Charleroi ===
Joffre's Instruction 13 mentioned that the Germans had thirteen or more corps in Belgium, of which eight were north of the Meuse. If these turned south then Lanrezac was to leave his position to the British and Belgians and attack into the Ardennes, as Joffre wrongly believed that a strong German thrust through Belgium would have left the German centre (in the Ardennes) weak.

Lanrezac declined to attack as Joffre wished on 21 August as the BEF were not yet in position on his left. With the French Third and Fourth Armies now attacking into the Ardennes, Lanrezac also declined to send reinforcements to Namur, which he had been warned would not hold out. On 22 August Lanrezac attempted to drive the Germans across the Sambre and failed. Later that day the German Second Army attacked the French Fifth Army and forced bridgeheads across the Meuse. Within a fortnight, Joffre had sacked one of the French corps commanders—General Sauret of III Corps, who had disappeared during the battle, leaving the corps artillery commander to take charge—and three of the four division commanders involved. Lanrezac had 193 battalions and 692 guns.

The French III and X corps counterattacked but were beaten further back. Lanrezac's countermanding orders never reached X Corps. Lanrezac's Fifth Army was now attacked on its right by the German Third Army; although these attacks were held, Lanrezac asked Joffre for permission to retreat. Lanrezac asked for the BEF to attack the German Second Army in flank, although, contradicting himself, he also reported that the BEF was still in echelon behind his own left flank, which if true would have made it impossible for the BEF to do as he asked. Sir John, who had cancelled his own planned advance on news that Lanrezac had asked to fall back, agreed to hold his position.

23 August was the third day of the Battle of Charleroi. A more aggressive commander than von Bülow might have been able to drive in III and X Corps in the French centre, but despite repeated pleas from 10am onward, Lanrezac refused Franchet d'Esperey's I Corps permission to counterattack from the French right. He also vetoed an attack by XVIII Corps on his left to relieve pressure on the British. The Fifth Army was attacked again, this time also on the flanks, by Bülow's German Second Army to the north and Hausen's German Third Army to the east. Hausen, attacking at Onhaye, south of Dinant, was thrown back by Mangin's brigade, but was prevented from driving southwest to cut off the French retreat only by several entreaties by von Bülow to attack westwards to draw off French strength from von Bülow's front. Learning that de Langle's Fourth Army was falling back on his right flank, Lanrezac fell back, worried of another Sedan. With his left and centre driven from the Sambre and the Germans threatening a Meuse crossing on right, in Holger Herwig's view, Lanrezac's retreat from Charleroi may well have saved Fifth Army from annihilation.

Lanrezac was impressed by the performance of the French 75mm guns, and devoted time to finding appropriate places to deploy them.

==== Retreat from Charleroi ====
Lanrezac's retreat after the Battle of Charleroi (21–3 August) arguably saved the French army from decisive defeat as it prevented the much sought envelopment of the Schlieffen plan. In the small hours of 24 August, just after the Battle of Mons, the BEF was forced to retreat on news that Lanrezac was falling back, which disgusted Sir John French, and that the French Third and Fourth Armies were also falling back after being defeated at Virton and Neufchâteau.

Churchill later wrote:"The French Fifth Army had no sooner completed with severe exertions its deployment on the Sambre, and the British Army by forced marches had no sooner reached the neighbourhood of Mons, when the overwhelming force of the German turning movement through Belgium fell upon them ... [Sir John French] accepted [Joffre's wish to attack, even on the left] with implicit faith. Lanrezac, sure that Joffre was utterly adrift from facts, watched with insolent distrust the impending disaster. But even he never imagined the weight and sweep of the German enveloping wing. The two armies of the left only escaped disaster by the timely retreat which Lanrezac and Sir John French each executed independently and on his own initiative ... Lanrezac's grasp of the situation and stern decision to retreat while the time remained has earned the gratitude of France. It was a pity he forgot to tell his British Allies about it."

Sordet, whose cavalry were holding the gap between the two forces, had telegraphed to Lanrezac at 8pm on the 23rd that Sir John was pulling back to the line Bavai-Maubeuge (in fact this was a slight misunderstanding, as he was just making inquiries about the possibility doing so), and asked if he should "keep to [his] mission on its left". Edward Spears argued that this may have been the source for the "legend" that Lanrezac pulled back because the BEF was doing so. He wrote that in fact Lanrezac pulled back before receiving the message and answering it at 11.30pm. Tuchman disagreed, citing Lanrezac's later writing that he had "received confirmation" of Sordet's message. She also scoffed at Spears' claim that "no evidence" had been found, observing that Adolphe Messimy testified at the postwar Briey hearings that there were 25 to 30 million relevant documents for the period in the archives.

On the morning of 26 August, while the BEF II Corps was engaged at the Battle of Le Cateau, Sir John French had a hostile meeting with Joffre and Lanrezac at Saint-Quentin. Lanrezac was only reluctantly persuaded by his chief of staff to attend, and before Joffre's arrival he was observed loudly criticising both GQG and the BEF, making a poor impression on the junior officer who witnessed it. Lanrezac had his pince nez hanging from his ear "like a pair of cherries" and gave the impression of being bored whilst Joffre was speaking. However, he assured Joffre that Fifth Army would be ready to counterattack as soon as he was out into open country where he could use his artillery. French complained of Lanrezac's behaviour, to which Lanrezac shrugged and gave a vague and academic reply. Joffre stayed for lunch (Lanrezac declined to do so), at which the atmosphere improved, as Joffre confessed that he too was dissatisfied with Lanrezac.

=== Battle of Guise ===
At the meeting with Joffre and Sir John French on 26 August, Lanrezac had expressed a willingness to counterattack, but only after he had first retreated to a better position. Colonel Victor Huguet, the liaison officer, reported (10:15pm on 26 August) that the British had been "defeated" at Le Cateau and would need French protection to recover cohesion, and Joffre decided to order an attack by Fifth Army to relieve the British. Joffre later claimed that he had suffered two sleepless nights as he contemplated sacking Lanrezac before the battle of Guise.

At 6:30am on 27 August Joffre sent Lanrezac an urgent message reminding him of his promise to counterattack. This angered Lanrezac, who spent the day—both on the telephone to GQG and in conversation with Lt-Col Alexandre of GQG, who had visited him at his HQ at Marle twice—arguing against the order, and he again demanded to be permitted to fall back when he learned that the BEF intended to retreat again on 28 August. After a tense discussion Lanrezac agreed to attack from Guise rather than first retreat further to Laon, and as soon as his forces were on open ground where they could use their artillery—which Lanrezac had told Joffre was the key factor—and to take no account of what the British on his left were doing. At 8:10pm on 27 August Joffre ordered him to relieve the British by attacking west rather than northwest. Lanrezac objected strenuously, reluctant to undertake a 90-degree turn in the face of enemy forces. Lanrezac sent Lt-Col Alexandre back with the words "before trying to teach me my business, sir, go back and tell your little strategists to learn their own."

Joffre visited Lanrezac at 8:30am on 28 August, and ordered Lanrezac to attack to the west, against the forces engaging the BEF. He later recorded that he had been struck by Lanrezac's tired appearance, and that he had a "yellow complexion, bloodshot eyes," and that a "heated" discussion ensued. Lanrezac criticised Joffre's plan, without mentioning that he had already reordered his corps as Joffre had ordered. Spears recorded that Joffre, painfully aware that he could not allow the BEF to be crushed on French soil, exploded with rage. At last Lanrezac agreed to obey, at which point Joffre had his aide Major Gamelin draw up a written order and signed it in Lanrezac's presence. President Poincaré recorded rumours that Joffre had threatened to have Lanrezac shot. Joffre later wrote of the difference in aggression between Lanrezac and de Langle de Cary, whose Fourth Army, originally intended to be the spearhead of the attack into the Ardennes, was a strong force and had made several counterattacks.

French refused Haig (commanding British I Corps) permission to join in an attack by Lanrezac (28 August), who wrote "c'est une félonie" and later wrote of French's "bad humour and cowardice." The BEF also did not join in Lanrezac's attack on the German Second Army at Guise (29 August). Joffre spent the morning at Lanrezac's headquarters to supervise his conduct of the battle (29 August), willing to give Lanrezac a final chance but if necessary to sack him there and then. In the event he was impressed by Lanrezac's cool demeanour and handling of the battle, before departing for an afternoon meeting with Sir John French. Joffre later wrote that Lanrezac had shown "the greatest quickness and comprehension" in ordering the westward attack towards Saint-Quentin to be broken off, so as to concentrate on the successful attack by Franchet d'Esperey's I Corps in the north at Guise.

As a result of the battle of Guise, von Kluck's German First Army broke off its attacks on Maunoury's Sixth French Army and swung southeast, inside of Paris. However, Lanrezac's victory had left him in an exposed forward position, and he had a telephone conversation with General Belin at GQG, warning him that he had been directly ordered to hold his position and attack if possible, and that his army was in danger of being cut off and encircled. Permission to retreat finally reached him at 7am the next morning. Although Terraine sees Guise as a French tactical victory, Herwig is critical of Lanrezac for holding back Franchet d'Esperey's I Corps for much of the day, and for failing to exploit the gap between German Second and Third Armies. However, he is more critical of von Bülow (commander of German Second Army and effectively Army Group commander over von Kluck's First Army in the west and Hausen's Third Army to his east) for failing, for the second time, to encircle and destroy Lanrezac's Army.

On 31 August, German cavalry, hampered by lack of fresh horseshoes and nails, almost penetrated behind French Fifth Army, almost capturing the British politician J.E.B. Seely then serving as a liaison officer, and came close to capturing the Aisne bridges, which would have cut off its retreat. On 1 September Fifth Army retreated across the Aisne in some confusion, with Lanrezac at one stage being heard to exclaim "Nous sommes foutus! Nous sommes foutus!" (roughly: "We're shafted!").

=== Dismissal ===
Lanrezac's harsh criticism of his superiors in the Staff Corps overshadowed his impressive ability to avoid envelopment by the Germans, and he was replaced by Louis Franchet d'Espérey just before the opening of the First Battle of the Marne. Joffre later recorded that ever since the Battle of Guise, Lanrezac's normal tendency to criticise and argue about his orders had been exacerbated by fatigue, to the detriment of Fifth Army staff's morale. Lanrezac's staff were bickering among themselves. As he could not be counted upon for the planned counterstroke, it was necessary to relieve him on the afternoon of 3 September. The eyewitness accounts of Lanrezac (who claimed that he protested that events had proved him right about most of the issues under dispute, but that Joffre refused to meet his gaze, so that it was clear that he had exhausted Joffre's confidence), Joffre (who claimed that Lanrezac immediately agreed and cheered up when relieved of command, in his own office) and Spears (who recalled seeing them having a lengthy and strained conversation in the playground of the school where Fifth Army HQ was currently based) differ somewhat.

Joffre and Spears both claimed in their memoirs that, whatever his intellectual accomplishments, Lanrezac had been overwhelmed by the strain of command, Spears adding that he had done little to prepare the Charleroi position for defence and had never once in the entire campaign willingly engaged the enemy. Much of Lanrezac's poor reputation in English comes from Spears' memoirs (Liaison 1914) published in 1930. Coming after criticism of the British in the memoirs of Huguet and Foch, the book was a great success, Harold Nicolson writing that he had especially enjoyed the "satirical" portrait of the "conceit(ed) ... arrogant and obese" Lanrezac. However, General Macdonogh, who had been Head of BEF Intelligence in 1914, thought Spears had been unfair to Lanrezac, whilst Lanrezac's son disputed the accuracy of his account of the Rethel meeting, writing that Lanrezac's most scathing comments about the British had been directed at his own staff afterwards. Sir John French had in fact been complimentary about Lanrezac in his diary after the meeting, although his feelings appear to have soured thereafter.

Lanrezac stayed in retirement for the rest of the war, refusing an offer of re-employment in 1917. In 1921, he published a book on the campaign—"Le Plan de campagne français et le premier mois de la guerre, 2 août-3 septembre 1914."

In recognition of his initially unappreciated prudence in the opening month of the war that helped save France, he was made an officer of the Légion d'honneur in July 1917, awarded the Grand Cross of the Order of the Crown by Belgium in 1923, and awarded the Grand Cross of the Légion d'honneur in 1924.

Following his death in January 1925, he was, at his request, buried without military honours.

The city of Paris honored Lanrezac by naming a street after him near the Place de l'Étoile. The Rue du Général Lanrezac, one block from the Arc de Triomphe, is a side street connecting Avenue Carnot with Avenue MacMahon. Other streets bearing Lanrezac's name are to be found in Marseille, Nantes, Neuilly-sur-Seine and Saint-Malo.
