= Karl von Bülow =

German officer in WWI

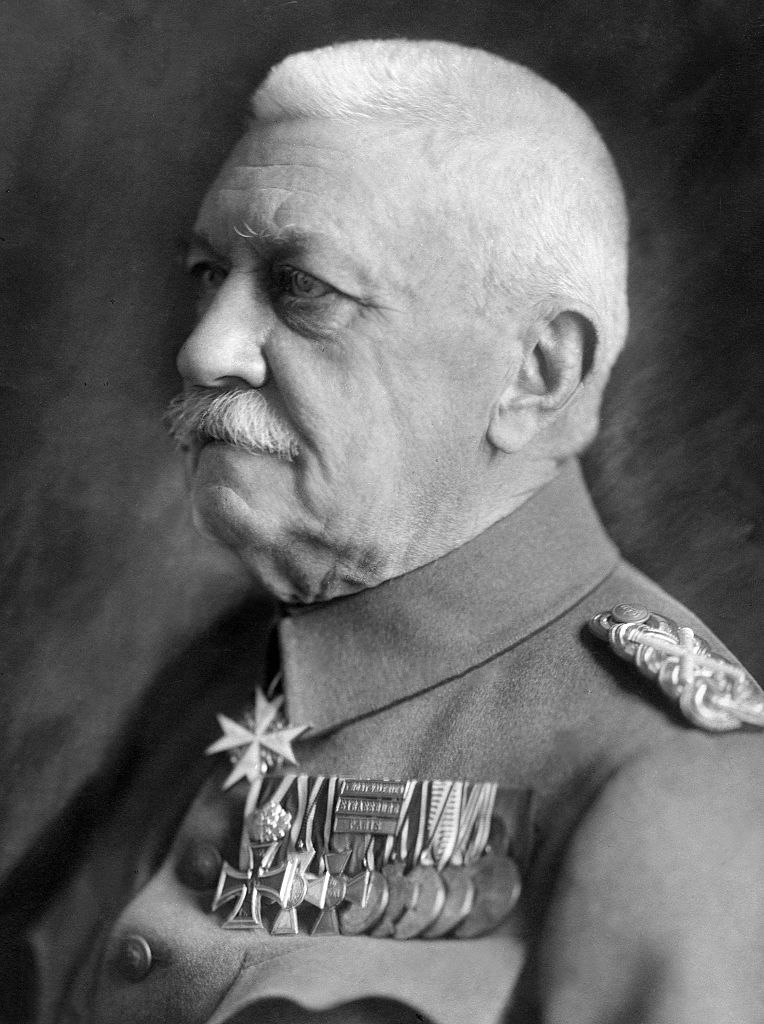
- Born: 24 March 1846; Berlin, Kingdom of Prussia, German Confederation
- Died: 31 August 1921 (aged 75); Berlin, Free State of Prussia, Weimar Republic
- Burial place: Invalidenfriedhof Berlin
- Military career
- Allegiance: North German Confederation; German Empire
- Branch: Imperial German Army
- Service years: 1866–1916
- Rank: Generalfeldmarshall
- Commands: 2nd Army
- Conflicts: Austro-Prussian War; Franco-Prussian War; World War I
- Awards: Pour le Mérite; Knight Grand Cross of the Royal Victorian Order (United Kingdom)

Karl Wilhelm Paul von Bülow (24 March 1846 – 31 August 1921) was a German field marshal commanding the German 2nd Army during World War I from 1914 to 1915.

== Early life ==
Bülow was born in Berlin on 24 March 1846 into a distinguished Prussian military family von Bülow, originally from Mecklenburg. He was a son of Marie Wilhelmine Friederike Johanna von Waldow (1817–1911) and Friedrich Heinrich Johann Paul von Bülow (1807–74), a Prussian Lieutenant colonel.

His paternal grandfather was Karl Johann Heinrich von Bülow (1769–1813), a Prussian major and commander of the Leibgrenadier battalion who was killed at Groß-Görschen during the German campaign of 1813.

== Career ==
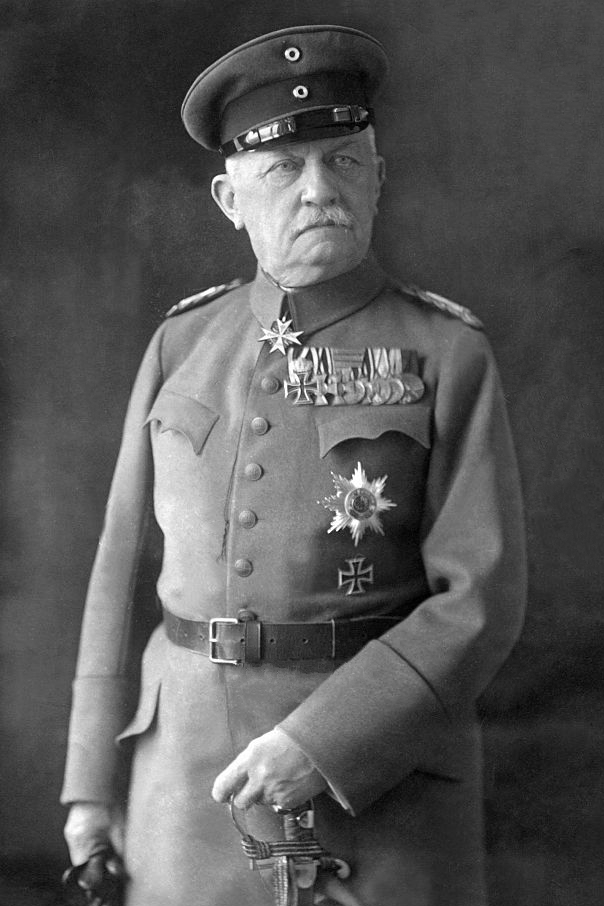
Karl von Bülow c. 1916

He enlisted in the Prussian Army and was assigned to the 2nd Guards regiment of infantry in 1864. He saw action during the Austro-Prussian War in 1866 and gained distinction at Königgrätz. Von Bülow served through the Franco-Prussian War of 1870 as a junior officer, winning the Iron Cross Second Class. A Captain of the German General Staff in 1877, von Bülow was promoted to Colonel and assigned to the 9th Guards Regiment in 1894. In 1897, von Bülow was a major-general and became director of the Central Department in the German War Ministry. In 1900 he was promoted to lieutenant-general and in 1901 was appointed general commanding the Guards Division. He was Commander of the German III Corps from 1903 until his appointment as Inspector of the German 3rd Army in 1912.

=== World War I ===
Assigned to the German 2nd Army at the beginning of World War I in August 1914, von Bülow's army was part of the German force that invaded Belgium. He occupied Liège on 7 August and captured the fortress of Namur on 22–23 August. In France, von Bülow defeated General Charles Lanrezac of the French Fifth Army at Charleroi on 23–24 August and again at Saint-Quentin on 29–30 August.

As the 2nd Army and General Alexander von Kluck's 1st Army neared Paris from 31 August to 2 September, von Bülow, concerned about the growing gap between the two armies, ordered Kluck to turn the 1st Army on his right towards him. This decision, however, resulted in Kluck's advancing south and east of Paris, instead of south and west as specified in the Schlieffen Plan. Von Bülow crossed the Marne on 4 September, but was ordered to retreat to the Aisne after the successful counterattack by combined French and British forces against Kluck's 1st Army at the First Battle of the Marne from 5–10 September. Von Bülow was believed by the German public to be responsible for the German failure to capture Paris.

Von Bülow was promoted to Field Marshal in January of the following year. He suffered a heart attack two months later and a month after that, on 5 April 1915, he was awarded the Pour Le Mérite. He was allowed to retire in early 1916, living in Berlin until his death.

== Personal life ==
In 1883, Bülow married Molly von Kracht in Potsdam. Together, they were the parents of one daughter and two sons, including diplomat Vicco von Bülow-Schwante (1891–1970).

== Decorations and awards ==
- Order of the Black Eagle with Chain (Prussia) – invested 18 January 1900
- Order of the Crown, 1st class (Prussia)
- Iron Cross of 1870, 2nd class (Prussia)
- Service Cross (Prussia)
- Military Merit Medal, 1st class (Prussia)
- Cross of Merit, 1st class of the Princely House Order of Hohenzollern
- Commander Second Class of the Order of Berthold I (Baden)
- Grand Cross of the Military Merit Order (Bavaria)
- Grand Cross with the Crown in Gold of the House Order of the Wendish Crown (Mecklenburg)
- Honorary Grand Cross of the House and Merit Order of Peter Frederick Louis (Oldenburg)
- Order of the Rue Crown (Saxony)
- Commander of the Second Class of the Albert Order (Saxony)
- Commander 2nd class of the Friedrich Order (Württemberg)
- Commander of the Order of Order of Leopold (Belgium)
- Grand Cross of the Order of Military Merit with Diamonds (Bulgaria)
- Knight Grand Cross of the Royal Victorian Order (United Kingdom)
- Grand Cross of the Order of the Sacred Treasure (Japan)
- Grand Officer of the Order of Saints Maurice and Lazarus (Italy)
- Grand Cross of the Order of the Crown of Italy
- Order of the Iron Crown, 2nd class (Austria)
- Grand Cross of the Order of Franz Joseph
- Commander of the Order of the Star of Romania
- Grand Cross of the Order of the Crown (Romania)
- Order of Saint Stanislaus, 1st class (Russia)
- Grand Cross of the Order of the Sword (Sweden)
- Order of the Medjidie, 2nd class (Ottoman Empire)
- Iron Cross of 1914, 1st class
- Hanseatic Cross (Lübeck)
- Pour le Mérite (4 April 1915)
- Grand Commander of the Royal House Order of Hohenzollern with Swords (22 June 1916)

== Notes ==
Military offices
Preceded by Franz Xaver von Oberhoffer	Quartermaster-General of the German Army; 8 February 1902 – 15 February 1904	Succeeded by Moltke the Younger
Preceded by Formed from III Army Inspectorate (III. Armee-Inspektion)	Commander, 2nd Army; 2 August 1914 – 4 April 1915	Succeeded by General der Infanterie Fritz von Below
