= Pierre Ruffey =

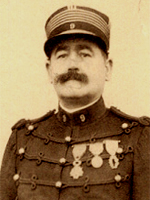
General Pierre Ruffey

Pierre Xavier Emmanuel Ruffey (19 March 1851 – 14 December 1928) was a French Army general who commanded the Third Army during the opening of World War I.

== Biography ==
He was educated at Saint-Cyr, from which he graduated in 1873. Upon graduation, he was posted to Madagascar. Following that he was a professor at the Ecole de Guerre. He was promoted to colonel in 1901, rising to divisional commander four years later and appointed to the French Supreme War Council in 1913.

Ruffey was an apostle of aircraft and heavy artillery. Ruffey, like Lanrezac (and Gallieni before World War I) warned of the danger of a German thrust westward through Belgium. French Commander-in-Chief Joseph Joffre, who planned to attack into the Ardennes, bluntly told him “you are wrong”.

Ruffey was given command of the Third Army at the outbreak of war and charged with attacking along the line from Montmedy to Rocroi. Third Army consisted of IV, V and VI Corps, the 7th Cavalry Division and a group of three reserve divisions. His army came under heavy German pressure from mid-August, suffering a defeat at the Battle of the Ardennes, a part of the Battle of the Frontiers. On 23 August Ruffey warned his corps commanders not again to send infantry on bayonet charges without fire support from artillery or even small arms.

Ruffey’s chief of operations, Colonel Tanant, said he was clever and full of a thousand ideas, one of which was magnificent, but the question was which one. His army was forced to retreat to Verdun after heavy fighting; Joffre found Ruffey “very nervous” and “bitter” about the performance of his subordinates, and so dismissed him from command and replaced him by Maurice Sarrail. Ruffey blamed his defeat on the holding back of two reserve divisions to the Army of Lorraine (40,000 men). He later told Joffre that if he had these two divisions and the 7th Cavalry Division, he could have rolled up the enemy’s left – Joffre replied “chut, il ne faut pas le dire” ("one musn't say that") – it is unclear whether or not Joffre agreed with Ruffey.

Ruffey held no other active commands during the war; he died in 1928.
