= 3rd Army (France) =

The Third Army (French: IIIe Armée) was a Field army of the French Army, which fought during World War I and World War II.

During the Second World War, it included the 6th and 42nd Army Corps.

== Commanders ==
=== World War I ===
- General Ruffey (Mobilization – 30 August 1914)
- General Sarrail (30 August 1914 – 22 July 1915)
- General Humbert (22 July 1915 – Armistice)

=== World War II ===
- General Charles-Marie Condé (2 September 1939 – 20 June 1940)

== See also ==
- 3rd Army Corps (France)
- List of French armies in WWI
