= 5th Army (France) =

Fifth Army
- Memorial to the 5th Army
- Active: 1914–1918; 1939–1940
- Country: France
- Branch: French Army
- Type: Field army
- Engagements: First World War; 1st Guise; 1st Marne; 1st Aisne; 2nd Aisne; 3rd Aisne; 2nd Marne; Meuse–Argonne offensive; Second World War; Phony War; Battle of France

Commanders
- Notable commanders: Charles Lanrezac; Louis Franchet d'Espèrey; Victor Bourret

The Fifth Army (French: Ve Armée) was a field army of the French Army that fought during World War I and World War II.

== World War I ==
On 29 August 1914 the 5th Army under Lanrezac won a partial victory at the battle of Guise, delaying the German attack. However, Lanrezac was replaced by Louis Franchet d'Espèrey on 3 September 1914. Under its new commander, it participated in the victory at the First Battle of the Marne.

Among its units in 1915 was an air squadron, Escadrille 12.

== World War II ==
During the Battle of France in 1940, the Fifth Army was part of the Second Army Group. It was responsible for the defense of the Maginot Line sector in Lower Alsace, from the Rhine to the Vosges mountains.

=== Order of Battle (10 May 1940) ===
At the start of the German offensive, the Fifth Army was commanded by Général d'armée Victor Bourret. Its headquarters was located at Wangenbourg.

- Army Assets (attached)
  - Pioneer Regiments: 403rd, 443rd, and 444th Pioneer Regiments.
  - Heavy Artillery: 115th and 116th Heavy Artillery Regiments (RALH).
  - Tank Support: 10th Tank Battalion (10e BCC).
- 8th Army Corps (Général de division Girol)
  - 24th Infantry Division (Général de brigade d'Arbonneau)
  - 31st Infantry Division (Général de brigade Vauthier)
- 12th Army Corps (Général de division Dentz)
  - 16th Infantry Division (Général de brigade Mordacq)
  - 35th Infantry Division (Général de brigade Decharme)
  - 70th Infantry Division (Général de brigade Gibert)
- 17th Army Corps (Général de corps d'armée Noël)
  - 62nd Infantry Division (Général de brigade Petit)
  - 103rd Fortress Division (Général de division Vallée)
- 43rd Army Corps (Général de division Lescanne)
  - 30th Infantry Division (Général de brigade Duron)
- Army Reserves
  - 44th Infantry Division (Général de brigade Beynet)

== See also ==
- List of French armies in WWI
- Battle of France order of battle
