= André Sordet =

French general (1852–1923)

Jean François André Sordet
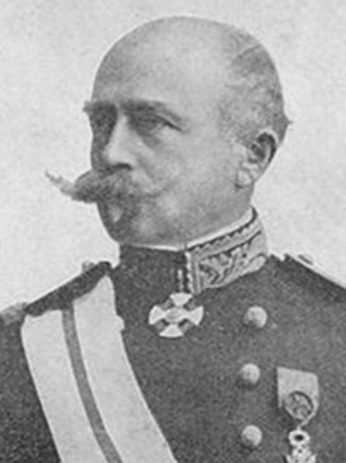
- Jean-François André Sordet
- Born: 17 May 1852; Saint-Germain-du-Plain, Saône-et-Loire, France
- Died: 28 July 1923 (aged 71)
- Military career
- Allegiance: France
- Service years: 1870–1916
- Rank: Général de Division
- Commands: 5th Dragoon Division; 10th Army Corps; 1st Cavalry Corps
- Conflicts: Franco-Prussian War; World War I, Battle of the Frontiers
- Awards: Commander of the Légion d'honneur
- Other work: Inspector General of Cavalry Depots

General Jean-François André Sordet (17 May 1852 – 28 July 1923) was a senior officer of the French Army. During the First World War his cavalry corps operated close to the British Expeditionary Force during the Battle of the Frontiers and during Great Retreat of August 1914.

== Early career ==
Born on 17 May 1852 at Saint-Germain-du-Plain in the Saône-et-Loire department, the son of Claude Alfred Sordet and Marguerite Marie de la Blanche. Sordet was commissioned into the 57th Infantry Regiment as a second lieutenant in November 1870, during the Franco-Prussian War. In September 1871, he attended the École spéciale militaire de Saint-Cyr and specialised in the cavalry arm. By August 1903, Sordet had been promoted to General de brigade and was given command of the 5th Dragoon Brigade, followed by command of 5th Cavalry Division in September 1907, 4th Cavalry Division in April 1910 and X Army Corps in May 1912. He was appointed a Knight of the Legion of Honour in July 1893, an Officer in July 1904 and a Commander in December 1912.

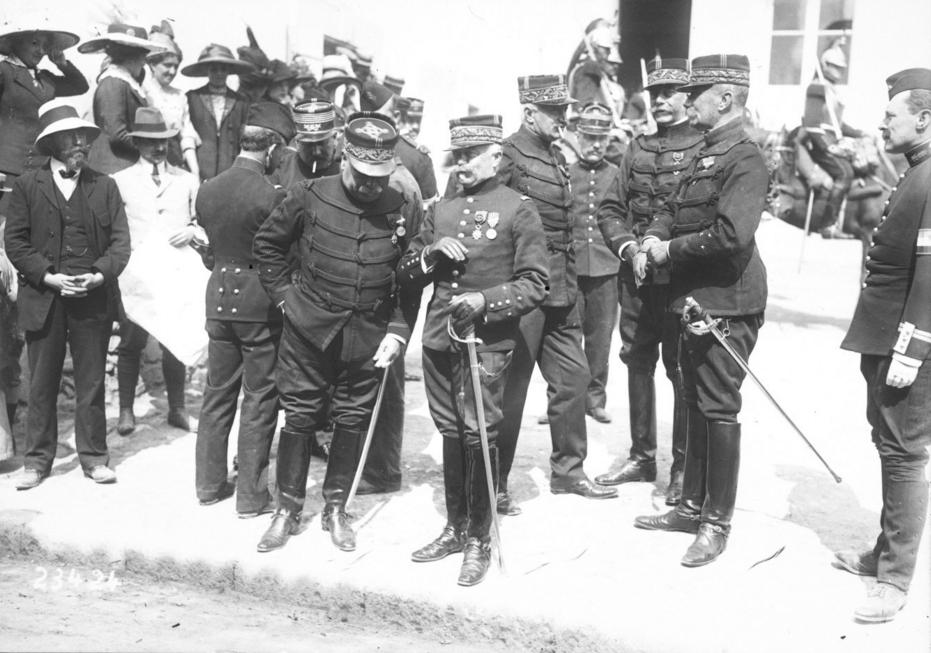
General Sordet (centre) and other officers, on manoeuvres in 1912

== Reconnaissance into Belgium ==
In 1914, Sordet commanded the I Cavalry Corps. General Joseph Joffre, the French Commander-in-Chief, believed that the main German thrust would be towards Verdun, but when Germany demanded passage of her troops through Belgium, he sent Sordet into the Belgian Ardennes region to reconnoitre in force on 5 August.

The Germans attacked the outermost Liège forts on 5 August. Sordet, with three cavalry divisions, were to enter south-eastern Belgium on 6 August to reconnoitre the area east of the Meuse (President Poincaré and War Minister Messimy had wanted to send five corps, but this suggestion did not meet with Joffre's approval). Between 5 and 8 August the cavalry searched the country east of the Meuse as far as Liège, covering 180 kilometres (110 miles) in the last three days. They got within 14 km (9 mi) of Liège, and also checked as far west as Charleroi, only to find no evidence of the Germans crossing the Meuse in order to march west through Belgium. Far from the opening weeks of war being marked by a "clash of cavalry" as predicted by pre-war theorists, Sordet's three divisions failed to find any German troops until 8 August, when they encountered a security screen of German cavalry and machine-guns from Jägers around the northern group of armies near Liège and Namur and were unable to assess the size of the German force.

The reconnaissance had been too early as half a million German infantry were still backed up on the roads from Germany. After an exhausting march in August heat with little water, Sordet's men were back roughly where they had started by 10 August. After a rest on 10 August Sordet's forces were in constant movement between 11 and 18 August. The Germans crossed the Meuse on 15 August, the first sign that they were coming further west than Joffre had anticipated. Sordet had been on the eastern side of the river. He made a brief attempt to attack the Germans from the south, but then crossed to the west bank at Givet and moved to a position northwest of Dinant.

Sordet's men often covered 55 km (34 mi) per day, and at one point in August the 9th Cuirassiers covered 160 km (99 mi) in 48 hours. Unlike British cavalry who were trained to conserve their horses' strength by leading them whenever possible, French cavalry remained mounted, causing saddle sores and the loss of many horses from exhaustion. Sordet's men had covered distances which, as Spears put it, "would have taxed even British cavalry", and yet he was under pressure to fulfil different roles. Sir John French wanted him to cover the assembly of the British Expeditionary Force (BEF), whereas Charles Lanrezac wanted him to gather tactical intelligence and was told by Joffre's deputy chief of staff Henri Berthelot on 17 August that this took priority. By 17 August, Liège having fallen, Sordet was ordered north of the Sambre by Joffre in a condition described by historian Barbara W. Tuchman as "shoeless". He was ordered to move up to Namur and Louvain to make contact with the remnants of Belgian Army to attempt to dissuade them from falling back on Antwerp. Grand Quartier Général (GQG) staff were unfairly angered at Sordet's "dilatoriness", even though his horses were too tired to do more than walk. Lanrezac demanded to Joffre on morning of 18 August that he have use of Sordet's corps.

Sordet's forces had now had a chance to recover their strength and he reported that he would be ready to move again on 22 August. He asked permission to operate north of the Sambre against the Germans who were reported to be marching west against the British. Lanrezac lent the 11th Infantry Brigade (part of III Corps), but on 21 August Sordet's men were pushed out of Luttre and Pont-à-Celles, crossings on the Charleroi Canal north of the Sambre.

=== Order of battle of Sordet's Cavalry Corps ===
I Cavalry Corps: August 1914
- 1st Cavalry Division (General Buisson)
  - 5th Dragoon Brigade (General Silvestre)
    - 6th Dragoon Regiment
    - 23rd Dragoon Regiment
  - 2nd Cuirassier Brigade (General Louvat)
    - 1st Cuirassier Regiment
    - 2nd Cuirassier Regiment
  - 11th Dragoon Brigade (General Corvisart)
    - 27th Dragoon Regiment
    - 32nd Dragoon Regiment
- 3rd Cavalry Division (General de Lastours)
  - 3rd Light Brigade (General de la Villestreux)
    - 3rd Hussar Regiment
    - 8th Hussar Regiment
  - 13th Dragoon Brigade (General Leorat)
    - 5th Dragoon Regiment
    - 21st Dragoon Regiment
  - 4th Cuirassier Brigade (General Gouzil)
    - 4th Cuirassier Regiment
    - 9th Cuirassier Regiment
- 5th Cavalry Division (General Bridoux)
  - 5th Light Brigade (General Cornulier-Lucinière)
    - 5th Chasseur Regiment
    - 15th Chasseur Regiment
  - 3rd Dragoon Brigade (General Lallemand du Marais)
    - 13th Dragoon Regiment
    - 22nd Dragoon Regiment
  - 7th Dragoon Brigade (General de Marcieux)
    - 9th Dragoon Regiment
    - 29th Dragoon Regiment

== Charleroi and Mons ==
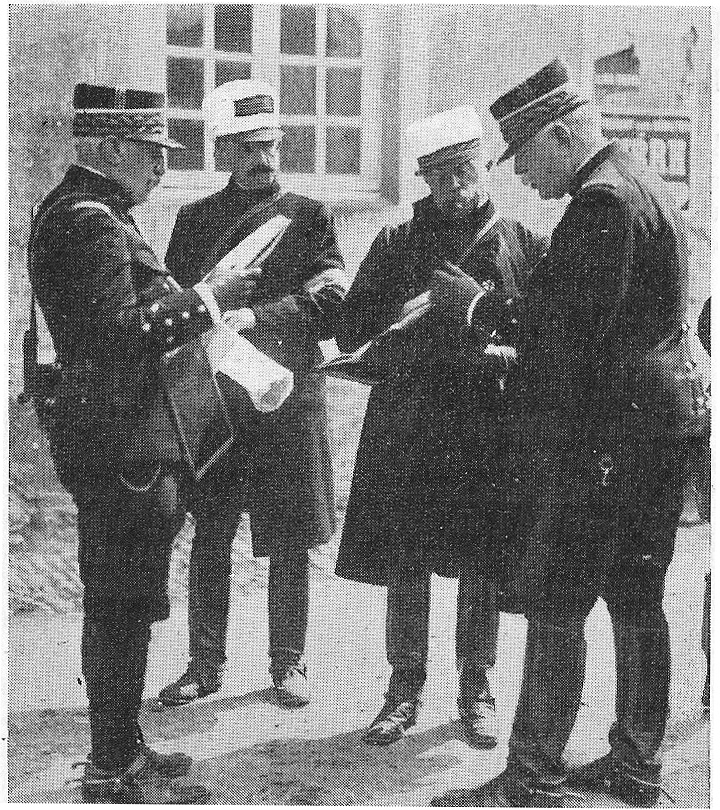
Sordet (third from the left) with generals Castelnau and Joffre, in a photograph published in Le Crapouillot.

On retiring, the corps was attached to the Fifth Army during the Battle of Charleroi (21–23 August) and the Battle of Mons (23 August). By the end of 22 August, Lanrezac, commander of the Fifth Army, reported that Sordet's corps was "greatly exhausted" and that it had had to pull back, helping to open a gap of 16 km (9.9 mi) – enough for a German corps – between Fifth Army's left and the right of the BEF. Together with the news which reached him at noon next day that the 4th Belgian Division was evacuating Namur, this helped decide Lanrezac to pull back from his position at Charleroi.

Sordet telegraphed to Lanrezac at 8:00 p.m. on 23 August that Sir John French was pulling back to the Bavai–Maubeuge line (in fact this was a slight misunderstanding, as he was just making inquiries about the possibility of doing so) and asked if he should "keep to [his] mission on its left". Edward Spears argued that this may have been the source for the "legend" that Lanrezac pulled back because the BEF was doing so. He wrote that Lanrezac pulled back before receiving the message and answering it at 11:30 p.m. Barbara Tuchman disagreed, citing Lanrezac's later claim that he had "received confirmation" of Sordet's message. She also scoffed at Spears' claim that "no evidence" had been found to link Lanrezac's retreat to concern about the British retreat, observing that Messimy testified at the postwar Briey hearings that there were 25 to 30 million relevant documents for the period in the archives.

== Le Cateau ==
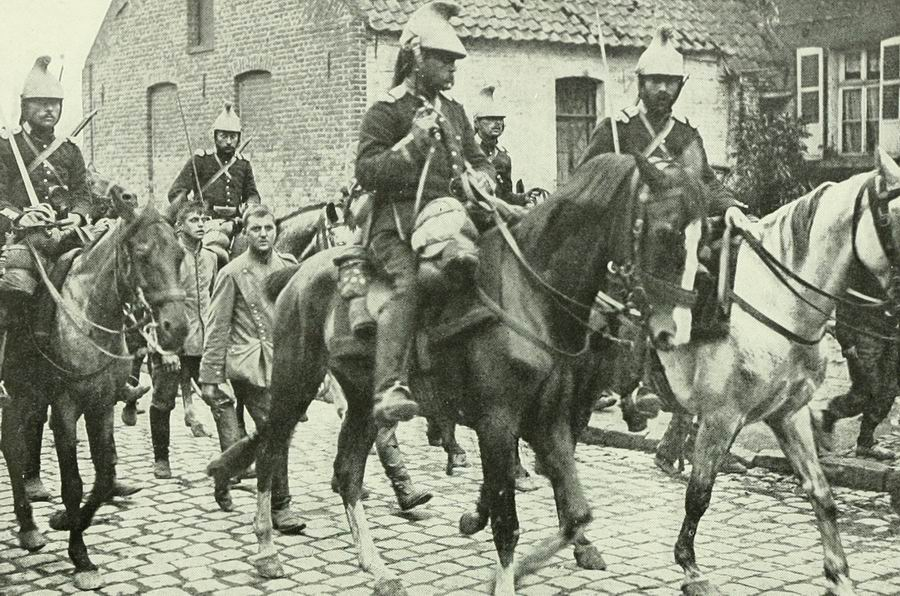
French dragoons, possibly from Sordet's corps, escorting German prisoners of war at Aniche on 24 August 1914.

Sir John French, worried at being cut off from the English Channel, visited Sordet at Avesnes on 24 August, and was informed that the Allied west flank was being defended by Territorial Army forces (reservists aged between 35 and 48) under Albert d'Amade at Arras and by the Lille garrison. Sir John asked Sordet to cover the British left, but Sordet initially asked to consult his own chain of command first. Sordet told Sir John that his horses were too tired to move, but he actually moved a long distance afterwards, a fact which Major-General Thomas Snow, commander of 4th Division, later cited as evidence that Sordet is unlikely to have done much during the Battle of Le Cateau. At 10:00 a.m. on 24 August Lanrezac, concerned that Sir John French might be falling back on his lines of communication and away from the French forces, ordered Sordet to fall back on Landrecies on the next day, between the BEF and the Fifth Army. Lanrezac changed his mind an hour or so later and ordered Sordet to fall back to the BEF left as previously ordered.

Later that day Lanrezac was informed that Joffre had taken direct command of Sordet with effect from 25 August, although GQG were not clear where he was. He brought his exhausted horses round the back of British and, in Spears' description, "that splendid little soldier never got rattled in the welter of contradictory orders he received", appearing on the British left on the evening of 24 August. Joffre wanted Sordet to reinforce d'Amade's three Territorial divisions and the Lille garrison, which was now free to deploy after Lille had been declared an open city.

On Tuesday 25 August, the I Cavalry Corps marched westward behind the BEF retreat, to the south of Esnes where British 12th Brigade was. That day, the War Minister, Messimy, complained to Joffre that German cavalry were running amok in Belgium and that "Sordet, who has had very little fighting, is asleep. This is inadmissible". This was unfair criticism from a man who was soon to be forced to resign. That night Sordet's forces passed behind the British forces and caused a delay of an hour until 1am in the pullback of II Corps. Sordet's corps was bivouacked between Walincourt and Esnes on the night of 25/26 August "wet through and the horses dead beat".

At the Battle of Le Cateau (26 August) Sordet's men were deployed on the British left. Sordet moved off south very early on 26 August. The 1st Cavalry Division moved to Villers-Guilain, 23 km (14 mi) south of Cambrai and the same distance from the 4th Division's left; it later moved forward to Cambrai. Sordet only moved up after receiving a message from Joffre timed 1:00 p.m. ordering him not just to cover the British left flank but "to intervene in the battle with all the forces at [his] disposal". Spears wrote that after a march of 48 km (30 mi) the previous day Sordet's artillery and cyclists attacked the flank of German forces attacking the 4th Division, using their 75mm guns. Sordet's artillery fought from Séranvillers and Florenville south of Cambrai. Smith-Dorrien heard Sordet's guns around 4.30pm. Sordet's action helped the 4th Division to pull away that night. The liaison officer Victor Huguet gave Sordet even greater praise on 28 August, claiming that he had helped the II (British) Corps to withdraw.

== British Generals' views of Sordet at Le Cateau ==
Snow was highly critical of Sordet's conduct at Le Cateau, believing that he never intended to do more than demonstrate, but that the French Territorials and artillery on the left had helped protect the British flank. Snow wrote that there were not enough Germans to attempt to turn the British left flank until 3:00 p.m. when the 4th Division was already beginning to withdraw. Snow thought the guns which were heard that afternoon were more likely to belong to the Cambrai garrison. Snow also wrote that Sordet's guns opened fire at 6:30 p.m. Snow was wrong, it was the time when Sordet broke off against the German IV Reserve Corps, and his forces undoubtedly helped the 4th Division to withdraw.

Smith-Dorrien, the commander of II Corps, thanked Sordet in his Order of the Day (29 August). In that document he wrote of the French on his left, especially the Territorials who had been engaging German troops further west, that "otherwise it is almost certain we should have had another corps against us on the 26th". Smith-Dorrien called the relevant chapter in his memoirs "Sordet's Tardy Help". In his original despatch (7 September) French wrote that Sordet gave no help and, according to General Snow, censured him. This was an exaggeration by Snow: French wrote that he sent Sordet an urgent message to support the retirement of the British left flank, but that Sordet was unable to intervene owing to the fatigue of his horses. In his unreliable memoirs 1914 French gave credit to Sordet, claiming that he had been ignorant of the assistance rendered by Sordet and d'Amade, and implying that Smith-Dorrien had misled him. By then French was keen to praise everybody but Smith-Dorrien, against whom he bore a grudge.

== Retreat and dismissal ==
On 27 August, GQG, that had again briefly lost contact with Sordet, ordered him to cover British left until the BEF had crossed the Somme, then remain around St Quentin until given further orders. Snow later wrote that the only time he ever saw "the great Sordet and his cavalry" during the retreat was on 27 August, when he saw several squadrons two miles (3.2 km) to the British left. The forces exchanged stirring messages via Colonel James Edmonds, only for the French cavalry to withdraw immediately under shrapnel fire.

Sordet, whose corps was by now incapable of fighting as a whole, formed a Provisional Cavalry Division under General Cornulier-Luciniere from the regiments which were still mobile, and placed it for two days at the disposal of Michel-Joseph Maunoury, commander of the Sixth Army. Maunoury was able to fall back behind the River Avre (29 August) because of the Battle of Guise.

Sordet was part of the Sixth Army from 30 August to 1 September. Captain Lepic of I Cavalry Corps, reconnoitring north-west of Compiègne on 31 August, saw nine German cavalry squadrons (Uhlans, some of whom had discarded their helmets, were wearing cloth caps and were pretending to be "Englisch") followed by an infantry column 15 minutes later. They were not making south for Paris but rather south-east for Compiègne, the beginning of the great turning movement east of Paris by the 1st Army(Alexander von Kluck).

Sordet was part of the Paris garrison (Joseph Gallieni, Military governor of Paris) from 1 September to 4 September. He crossed the Seine between Mantes and Melun on 3 September. He was then again placed under the command of the Sixth Army from 5 September, and was ordered to collect his troops together by 7 September in the region of Longjumeau–Brunoy, whilst the Provisional Cavalry Division moved east of Paris. In the space of a month, the corps had covered close to 1,500 kilometres (930 miles).

On 8 September, during the Battle of the Ourcq (part of the First Battle of the Marne), Sordet tried to envelop the northern flank of the 1st Army via the Bargny Plateau. His three divisions left their bivouacs around Nanteuil-le-Haudouin around dawn, approaching Lévignen. Sordet was dismissed by Joffre that day for having previously withdrawn his exhausted troops for rest and refitting. After the news filtered out that Sordet had been sacked (he was replaced by General Bridoux, formerly commander of 5th Cavalry Division), the 1st Cavalry Division and 3rd Cavalry Division attacked but gave up at dusk and returned to bivouacs to feed and water their horses. Over the next two days the 5th Cavalry Division conducted a long distance raid, almost capturing Kluck and the First Army HQ at Vendrest.

Sordet was one of fifty one French general officers who were relieved of their commands by Joffre in the first weeks of the war. Many were posted to the provincial garrison town of Limoges, and the verb limoger still means "to be dismissed"; Sordet was appointed Inspector-General of Cavalry Depots with an office initially in Orleans and by April 1916, in Paris. He was retired from active service in February 1917 and posted to the reserve in April 1917.

== Personal life ==
André Sordet was married in September 1888 to Blanche Marie Adèle Henriette Bergasse (1863–1939). They had four children; a son, Jacques (1889–1946), and three daughters, Marguerite (1892–1952), Yvonne (1895–1989) and Jeanne (1896–1969). Jacques Sordet fought as an infantry officer in the First World War and later became a journalist and music critic under the pen name "Dominique Sordet"; in 1937, Dominique founded and ran the right wing news agency Inter-France, which later supported the Vichy regime.

In retirement, General Sordet co-wrote, with Marcel Victor Auguste Boucherie, a history of his command in 1914, entitled Historique du Corps de Cavalerie Sordet, which was published in 1923. He died on 28 July 1923.

== Books ==
- Briastre, Jean-Paul (2013). Soldats du Quercitai (in French). Paris: Mon Petit Éditeur. ISBN 978-2-342-01559-1.
- Cassar, George H. (1985). The Tragedy of Sir John French. University of Delaware Press. ISBN 0-87413-241-X.
- Hastings, Max (2013). Catastrophe 1914: Europe Goes to War. New York: Alfred A. Knopf. ISBN 978-0-307-59705-2.
- Krause, Jonathan, ed. (2014). The Greater War: Other Combatants and Other Fronts, 1914–1918. Palgrave Macmillan. ISBN 978-1-137-36065-6.
- Senior, Ian (2012). Home Before the Leaves Fall: A New History of the German Invasion of 1914. Osprey. ISBN 978-1-848-84209-0.
- Smithers, A J (1970). The Man Who Disobeyed: Sir Horace Smith-Dorrien and His Enemies. Leo Cooper. ISBN 0-85052-030-4.
- Snow, Dan; Pottle, Mark, eds. (2011). The Confusion of Command, The War Memoirs of Lieutenant General Sir Thomas D'Oyly Snow, 1914–1915. London: Frontline Books. ISBN 978-1-84832-575-3.
- Spears, Sir Edward (1999) [1930]. Liaison 1914. Eyre & Spottiswood. ISBN 978-0304352289.
- Tuchman, Barbara (2014) [1962]. The Guns of August. Random House. ISBN 978-0345476098.
- Venner, Dominique (2000). Histoire de la collaboration (in French). Pygmalion / Gérard Watelet. ISBN 978-2857047841.
