= The Guns of August =

1962 book on the causes of World War I

- First edition cover
- Author: Barbara W. Tuchman
- Language: English
- Genre: Military history, narrative history
- Published: 1962 (Macmillan)
- Publication place: United States
- Media type: Print (Hardcover)
- Pages: 511
- OCLC: 30087894
- Dewey Decimal: 940.4/144 20
- LC Class: D530 .T8 1994

The Guns of August (published in the UK as August 1914) is a 1962 book centered on the first month of World War I written by Barbara W. Tuchman. After introductory chapters, Tuchman describes in great detail the opening events of the conflict. The book's focus then becomes a military history of the contestants, chiefly the great powers.

The Guns of August provides a narrative of the earliest stages of World War I, from the decisions to go to war up until the start of the Franco-British offensive that stopped the German advance into France. This led to four years of trench warfare. The book discusses military plans, strategies, world events, and international sentiments before and during the war.

The book was awarded the Pulitzer Prize for General Nonfiction for publication year 1963, and proved very popular. Tuchman later returned to the subject of the social attitudes and issues that existed before World War I in a collection of eight essays published in 1966 as The Proud Tower: A Portrait of the World Before the War, 1890–1914.

== Synopsis ==
The book starts with the May 1910 funeral of King Edward VII, using that scene to introduce leaders of the European monarchies and their relationships with each other. This event marked the last time they were together peacefully. These figures went on to become central to World War I. This includes Kaiser (Note: This section and the next, which summarizes Tuchman's book, are written in American English and follow the author's spelling and usage conventions (e.g. the Kaiser or Kaiser instead of Emperor, Franchet d'Esperey instead of Franchet d'Espèrey, Kluck for von Kluck), are not narrated in the third person and quote with page references any word copied from the book. These rules, but the last one, have been relaxed in the other sections of this article.) Wilhelm II of Germany and Archduke Franz Ferdinand of Austria.

The remaining twenty one chapters of the book are grouped in three parts: "Plans", "Outbreak" and "Battle".

"Plans" delves into the prewar military strategies of the four major European powers:

- Germany – Facing threats from the West and the East since the 1890s, the Schlieffen Plan was designed to avoid fighting a prolonged war at two fronts at once by quickly beating France, as done in 1870 (and again in 1940), before the Russian Empire could mobilise its forces. It relied on attacking France through Belgium with a strong right wing, but Schlieffen's successor as the chief of German General Staff, Helmuth von Moltke the Younger, weakened the plan, leading to assumptions of a swift victory that were overly optimistic (chapter 2).
- France – After decades of defensive strategies following their quick defeat at Sedan, France adopted General Joseph Joffre's offensive Plan XVII in 1913, emphasizing attack and broad operational plans (chapter 3).
- Britain – The military cooperation with France evolved from informal arrangements to a formal naval agreement and Britain preparing to deploy the British Expeditionary Force (BEF) but these initiatives were supported by a narrow and fragile political will (chapter 4).
- Russia – Despite internal weaknesses and corruption, Russia's massive army planned an invasion of Eastern Prussia, prompting Germany to prepare reactive strategies to protect this critical territory (chapter 5).

"Outbreak" meticulously chronicles the events that led Europe into war, hour by hour, between August 1 and 4, 1914:

- On August 1, Germany ordered general mobilization; its offensive might have taken a radically different direction if Wilhelm II, on the basis of a misunderstood telegram from London, had managed to convince Moltke to change plans; but Moltke prevailed and Luxembourg was invaded (chapter 6).
- France declared general mobilization on the same day in response to Germany's ultimatum to Russia while in London Prime Minister H. H. Asquith's divided Cabinet failed to move (chapter 7).
- On August 2, 1914, Germany presented Belgium with an ultimatum, which King Albert rejected (chapter 8).
- On August 3 and 4, political leaders in Germany, France, Belgium, and Britain unified their nations behind the war imperative; Germany declared war on France and invaded Belgium, which triggered Britain's entry into the war, with only a few leaders foreseeing a prolonged conflict (chapter 9).

"Battle" extensively details three of the four European military fronts of August 1914: (Note: Tuchman ignores the war fought between Austria and Russia and between Austria and Serbia, except as it touches on the Mediterranean. In her Author's Note, she explains that the "inexhaustible problems of the Balkans" would necessitate a "tiresome length," which fortunately can be omitted without sacrificing the "unity" of the book. Hostile relations between the Austro-Hungarian Empire and Kingdom of Serbia thus fail to merit further mention.)

- the Western Front: the Battle of the Frontiers (chapters 11 to 14), the battle of ideas (chapter 17), and the fighting in France up to the beginning of the First Battle of the Marne (chapters 19 to 22)
- the Eastern Prussia Front (chapters 15 and 16);
- the sea front: the Adriatic Campaign (chapter 10) and more generally the strategies of the three main naval forces, the UK, Germany and the US (chapter 18).

The afterword reflects on the First Battle of the Marne, highlighting the deadlock and immense human and material costs of the Western Front. Despite the Allies' eventual success in saving Paris, the war's initial battles failed to be decisive and resulted in a war of attrition. The next four years of war were mostly determined by the events that took place in August 1914.

== Summary by chapters ==
=== Ch. 1 – A Funeral ===
On May 20, 1910, of the nine kings who led the funeral of King Edward VII, Kaiser Wilhelm II held conflicted views on his deceased uncle. In public, he was the gravest and most attentionate mourner. In private, he scorned Edward's personal diplomacy which supported Britain's shift from isolation to alliances with former foes France and Russia, calling his uncle "Satan" for plotting to encircle Germany. Wilhelm's inner tension reflected a wider polarisation around the question of Germany's rise, illustrated by two influential books. In "The Great Illusion" Norman Angell demonstrated that any war between large states was impossible because of its exorbitant cost whereas General von Bernhardi argued in "Germany and the Next War" that his nation had to either attack and annihilate France, or accept its downfall. On that May morning of 1910 "the sun of the old world was setting in a dying blaze of splendor never to be seen again."

=== Plans ===
==== Ch. 2 – "Let the Last Man on the Right Brush the Channel with His Sleeve" ====
To avert a two-front war, Schlieffen saw it as a "military necessity" to attack France via Belgium, whose perpetual neutrality was guaranteed internationally since 1839. If Germany threw seven-eighths of its 1.5 million soldiers against France, it could beat it in six weeks before turning to Russia. Influenced by Clausewitz and the recent decisive victories over Austria and France, Schlieffen's plan aimed to march 34 active and 20 reserve divisions through Belgium. Such a strong right wing would envelop the French armies and rake in the BEF. Schlieffen presumed Belgium would merely protest but the Kaiser, who wanted more assurance, unsuccessfully attempted to bribe King Leopold II by promising him French territories and money. Moltke, who succeeded Schlieffen in 1906, weakened the right wing at each new iteration of the war plan. His version of June 1914 saw Paris capitulate 39 days after mobilisation but assumed delusively that every possible contingency could be planned for.

==== Ch. 3 – The Shadow of Sedan ====
The humiliating defeat at Sedan set France on the defensive for forty years. Sixteen war plans were produced, each defensive. But her direction changed a few years to 1914 after it gradually regained confidence in itself as a nation and General Foch planted the seed of the mystique of the will in the military doctrine. The War Council, pressed by the War Minister Messimy, replaced in 1911 the defensive General Michel with General Joffre, who developed Plan XVII, the first offensive war plan adopted by the War Council in May 1913 and ready for distribution to generals in February 1914. Its bold goal – go to Berlin via Mainz – was not supported by a detailed operational war plan like Schlieffen's but instead emphasised the army's imperative – Attack! – and laid out war options that generals could implement depending on circumstances.

==== Ch. 4 – "A Single British Soldier …" ====
Russia's defeat to Japan in 1905 precipitated Germany in probing France in Morocco and Britain in developing military arrangements with France after Campbell-Bannerman authorised Wilson to open informal works with his French counterpart. But this embryonic military cooperation waned after the first Moroccan crisis subsided. It re-emerged in 1910 when Wilson used his new position of Director of Military Operations and his friendship with Foch to reinvigorate joint war plans, just in time for the second Moroccan crisis of 1911, whose aftermath was a shake up of the Royal Navy's top brass, a naval agreement between Britain and France and a non-binding mutual support of their armies. Wilson delivered "Plan W" by the spring of 1914. Britain's military was ready to deploy the BEF and 145,000 men to France but the British political leaders were not: only the few involved in the CID were aware of these military commitments.

==== Ch. 5 – The Russian steamroller ====
Not withstanding its defeats (Crimea in 1856, Manchuria in 1905) and defects, Russia's imposing 6.5 million men army unsettled Germany and reassured France and Britain, its Triple Entente allies. After the defeat to Japan, Grand Duke Nicholas, as chair of the Council of National Defence, initiated military reforms but these were thwarted in 1908 when the conservatives dissolved it. The same year, (Note: Page 71, Tuchman writes, referring to Sukhomlinov: "This was the man who was Minister of War from 1908 to 1914." In reality, he was appointed Minister of War on March 11, 1909.) Sukhomlinov became Minister of War. Corrupt and inefficient, he froze the modernisation of the army and changed Chief of Staff six times by 1914. Still, despite these weaknesses, Russia planned to invade Eastern Prussia with two armies totalling 800,000 men. But Germany was determined to retain this vital territory. Max Hoffmann, anticipating that the Russian army would have to split around the Masurian lakes, considered two reactive tactics: a retreat or a frontal assault on either flank.

=== Outbreak ===
Archduke Franz Ferdinand's assassination on June 28, 1914, led Austria to seek Serbia's annexation, with German backing on July 5. Austria's ultimatum on July 23, followed by a declaration of war on July 28 and Belgrade's bombardment on July 29, provoked Russia to mobilize on July 30 to defend Slav interests and its prestige. Germany's ultimatum to Russia on July 31 intensified the crisis. "War pressed against every frontier."

==== Ch. 6 – August 1: Berlin ====
Kaiser Wilhelm decreed general mobilization at 5 PM on August 1, initiating the invasion of Luxembourg at 7 PM. However, an opportunity to change this course and the twentieth century emerged shortly after 5 PM when Foreign Minister Jagow and Chancellor Bethmann-Hollweg unexpectedly received a telegram from Ambassador Lichnowsky stating that Britain would remain neutral if Germany did not attack France. The Kaiser immediately sought to alter the war plan: "Now we can go to war against Russia only. We simply march the whole of our Army to the East!" But an apoplectic Moltke rebuked him: "Your Majesty, [the war plan] cannot be altered." Despite General von Staabs arguing in 1925 that technically four of the seven armies could have been deployed to the Eastern Front by August 15, temperamentally it is difficult to believe Germany would not have attacked France when Der Tag arrived. Lichnowsky's second telegram at 11 PM made this point moot: it clarified that Britain's neutrality required Germany to refrain from attacking both France and Russia. Admiral von Tirpitz pragmatically questioned the wisdom of serving an ultimatum to Russia if Germany did not intend to attack it, but diplomatic protocol and military schedules prevailed: the German die was cast.

==== Ch. 7 – August 1: Paris and London ====
On July 30, the French Cabinet, led by Premier Viviani, made the unprecedented decision "never before taken in history" to withdraw troops ten kilometers from its borders to avoid clashes with the German Army. Germany and Russia immediately sought France's stance in a potential conflict. On the evening of July 31, German Ambassador von Schoen posed the question through diplomatic channels, while Russian Ambassador Isvolsky pressed President Poincaré at 2 AM in his bedroom. Viviani responded to Schoen at 11 AM on August 1, stating, "France will act in accordance with her interests." Minutes later, Isvolsky informed the French of Germany's ultimatum to Russia. The Cabinet convened and decreed the general mobilization that Joffre had been advocating for since July 29. By 4 PM, the first mobilization posters appeared at Place de la Concorde, with mobilization starting at midnight.

The British Cabinet was divided over whether to support France in case of war. The four Liberal Imperialists, Asquith, Grey, Haldane, and Churchill, believed Britain's national interest lay in supporting France, while the Little Englanders led by Morley, were suspicious of any foreign adventures. Asquith patiently balanced the mounting tensions. At the July 31 Cabinet meeting, Grey threatened to resign if Britain chose neutrality over supporting France. The next day, Lloyd George described Germany's potential attack on France as requiring only a "little violation" of Belgian territory. Four Little Englanders – Morley, Burns, Simon, and Harcourt – proposed to resign if Britain implemented the naval agreement with France, and the Cabinet did not authorize Grey and Churchill's actions. Nevertheless, Churchill, who "smelled battle afar off [like] the war horse in Job" had already ordered the British fleet to its war stations at Scapa Flow on July 28 and persuaded Asquith on July 29 to authorize the Warning Telegram, initiating the Precautionary Period. After the Cabinet denied him further authority, Churchill mobilized the fleet upon learning that Germany had declared war on Russia. Grey, sensing that the Little Englanders might only be persuaded if Belgian neutrality was violated, asked France and Germany on July 31 if they would respect Belgian neutrality. France responded positively within an hour, but Germany remained silent.

==== Ch. 8 – Ultimatum in Brussels ====
On the morning of August 2, 1914, German Minister Claus von Below-Saleske assured Foreign Minister Davignon that Belgium had nothing to fear from Germany, despite the invasion of Luxembourg. That evening, Below was asked to open the sealed envelope he had received from Berlin on July 29: it contained Germany's ultimatum. Dumbfounded, he presented it to Davignon at 7 PM, expecting a reply by 7 AM the next morning. This carefully crafted document asserted that France was about to enter Belgium to attack Germany, which in reaction would "anticipate this attack" to assert its self-defense rights and have to pass through Belgium. Were Belgium to resist, it would be treated as an enemy. King Albert was less surprised than Below. In November 1913, Kaiser Wilhelm and General Moltke had conveyed to him their readiness to wage war against France, citing constant provocations. Despite the poor state of its army, which consisted of only six infantry and one cavalry division, no heavy artillery, no clear war strategy, and four different mobilization plans, Albert remained resolute: "Our answer must be 'No' whatever the consequences." As the Belgian officials were busy drafting their reply, the German government had second thoughts. Fearing that Belgian resistance would disrupt the critical operational schedule towards Paris, it instructed Below to persuade the Belgians to comply. At 1:30 AM on August 3, during a surprise visit to the Foreign Office, he used the fake news of French dirigibles bombing Nuremberg to imply that France would next invade Belgium. Unconvinced by this last-minute logic, Belgium formally rejected the German demand on August 3 at 7 AM, being "firmly resolved to repel every attack upon its rights." That evening, angered by the Kaiser's dismissive reply to the last-minute appeal he had sent on August 1, Albert ordered the destruction of bridges and tunnels to impede any German advance.

==== Ch. 9 – "Home before the leaves fall" ====
August 3 and 4 were key action days: the German, French, Belgian and British political leaders crystallized into national unions the tensions that had been building up for months, and the German General Staff declared war on France and invaded Belgium.

On the political front: At 3 PM on August 3, Grey revealed to the House of Commons the existence of informal military talks with France and asked it not to stand by and witness the violation of Belgian neutrality and the "unmeasured aggrandizement of any power whatsoever." The House responded with overwhelming applause.

On August 4 at 9 AM, an hour after Belgium was invaded, King Albert’s question to the parliament, “Are you unalterably decided to maintain intact the sacred gift of our forefathers?" was met with resounding shouts of "Oui! Oui! Oui!” A few hours later, Viviani’s eloquent speech to the joint session of the French Senate and Chamber was greeted with cheers, especially after announcing Italy's choice to stay neutral. Simultaneously in Berlin, the Kaiser famously declared in his speech from the throne: “From this day on, I recognize no parties but only Germans.” At 3 PM, Bethmann-Hollweg informed the Reichstag that German troops were “perhaps already in Belgium" and admitted publicly that this “invasion [was] contrary to international law”, after which it unanimously voted for a 5 billion mark war credit and adjourned for four months.

On the military front: On August 3 at 6:30 PM, Ambassador Schoen delivered to Viviani the German declaration of war on France on the ground of organized hostility, alleged French aviators bombarding Nuremberg and flying over neutral Belgium, all of which Viviani categorically denied.

On August 4, Germany invaded Belgium at Gemmerich at 8:02 AM after its ultimatum was rejected. Moltke, who had anticipated in 1912 that invading Belgium would trigger Britain’s entry into the war, was not surprised, contrary to the Kaiser and Beltmann-Hollweg, when Grey sent Britain’s ultimatum to Germany and demanded a reply by midnight.

The prevalent opinion in all belligerent countries was well captured by the Kaiser’s words to his departing troops: “You will be home before the leaves have fallen from the trees." Only Joffre, Moltke, and Kitchener foresaw a prolonged conflict, with Kitchener predicting the war would take “[at least] three years, [...such a long time that] no one living knows how long."

=== Battle ===
==== Ch. 10 – "Goeben ... An Enemy Then Flying" ====
Tuchman starts the "Battle" section by covering the search by Allied naval forces for the German battlecruiser Goeben in the Mediterranean (chapter 10). The Goeben finally took refuge in the Dardanelles, waters of the then neutral Ottoman Empire. Such naval actions set off diplomatic maneuvers, but the event precipitated Turkey's entry into the war on the side of Germany. The development worked to block Russian import/export via its year-round ports on the Black Sea. That, in turn, led to the disastrous Gallipoli Campaign.

==== Ch. 11 – Liège and Alsace ====
As they crossed the Belgian frontier, the German armies were engaged by the Belgian army in front of Liège, five French armies in the east of France and four British divisions (known as the British Expeditionary Force) in the south of Belgium. The French were said to be labouring under the delusion that Gallic élan would be crucial in countering German attacks while the British fought hard at the Battle of Mons. In August, each side deployed its armed forces in order to effect its own strategies developed in advance of the war (discussed in "Plans").

==== Ch. 12 – BEF to the Continent ====
The War Council met on August 5 to approve the General Staff's war plans but Lord Kitchener, a highly respected figure – "For England to have gone to war without Kitchener would have been as unthinkable as Sunday without church" – disrupted the proceedings. He predicted the war would last at least three years and require the army to grow from twenty-four to seventy divisions. Fearing that a joint commandment with the French would imperil the nucleus of the regular army around which he planned to build this stronger army, he expressed "profound contempt" for the war plan. Despite his objections, the Council agreed to send six BEF divisions to a French port, with the final location to be decided later.

That evening a leak from the Westminster Gazette about the BEF's size sparked uproar. The next day, the Council, meeting with French Colonel Huguet, reduced the BEF to four divisions and cavalry. Tensions flared when Kitchener reprimanded Wilson for revealing to Huguet BEF’s embarkation times, which he deemed a secret. Wilson’s sharp response – he viewed Kitchener "as much an enemy of England as Molke" – left a lasting strain on their cooperation which would not help the BEF.

On August 12, at the last War Council before engagement, Kitchener made a last attempt to shift the BEF’s concentration point seventy miles back from Maubeuge to Amiens, fearing a German envelopment. Despite his authority, even he could not alter the predetermined plan as there was no time for alternatives. After intense debate, he reluctantly conceded but issued John French conflicting orders: the BEF was to support France but avoid undue risk and remain entirely independent of Allied command. This lack of unity "was to haunt the Allied war effort long after Sir John was replaced and Kitchener himself was dead."

The 80,000 soldiers of the BEF embarked on August 9 and were greeted with a rapturous welcome by French crowds all their way to Mons.

==== Ch. 13 – Sambre et Meuse ====
Although delayed by Belgian resistance, the German armies advance through Belgium and prepare their right wing for the outflanking manoeuvre. The French get ready for their main offensive in the Ardennes. The BEF advances towards the left flank of the French armies. The Germans enter Brussels on August 20th.

==== Ch. 14 – Debacle: Lorraine, Ardennes, Charleroi, Mons ====
The French High Command had made incomplete allowances for dealing with the large massed attack by the German army, which now came quickly bearing down on them. It was perhaps through the decisions of Charles Lanrezac, the French Fifth Army commander, who acted in a timely fashion before getting permission from Joseph Joffre, that the entire French line was eventually saved from envelopment and general collapse. Although his pleas were ignored, Lanrezac withdrew his forces at Charleroi from an untenable position and probable destruction, and he redeployed them more favorably. He was later relieved of command.

==== Ch. 15 – "The Cossacks Are Coming" ====
The invasion of East Prussia began on August 12, when General Gurko, part of Rennenkampf's First Army, took the town of Marggrabowa. On August 17, Rennenkampf's 200,000-strong army crossed the border from the north, advancing along a 35-mile front toward the Insterburg Gap and pushing ahead of them a wave of panicked Germans, crying "The Cossacks are coming!" Meanwhile, Samsonov's Second Army was advancing from the south, intending to complete a pincer movement. However, poor coordination between the two Russian armies, unencrypted communications, and severe ammunition shortages undermined the plan.

Von Prittwitz’s Eighth Army had its own problems, the most prominent of which was its lack of leadership. On August 20, General von François, disobeying Prittwitz’s orders, charged ahead and defeated the Russian 28th Division at Gumbinnen. But when Mackensen's 35th Division was routed, Prittwitz insisted on retreating the army behind the Vistula. This reaction to the defeat led Moltke to dismiss at once Chief of Staff Waldersee and Prittwitz on August 21 and replace the former with Ludendorff on the same day, who immediately ordered François to move south to support General Scholtz’s XX Corps, and the latter with Hindenburg on August 23. Hindenburrg and Ludendorff met Scholtz at Tannenberg on August 24 and learned from intercepted communications that Samsonov’s army would launch a major attack the next day. Ignoring Rennenkampf’s northern forces, Hindenburg and Ludendorff concentrated their entire army on defeating Samsonov, setting the stage for the decisive Battle of Tannenberg.

==== Ch. 16 – Tannenberg ====
Chapter 16 presents Germany's reaction to the invasion which culminates at the Battle of Tannenberg, where the Russian advance is stopped, decisively. Tuchman covers the series of errors, faulty plans, poor communications, and poor logistics, which, among other things, decidedly helped the French in the west. For example, the Germans mistakenly transferred, from the west, two corps to defend against what the book refers to as the 'Russian Steam Roller'. The great misery that developed on the Eastern Front is noted.

==== Ch. 17 – The Flames of Louvain ====
Woven into the text about the battles in Belgium are threads of fact that Allied governments would employ in the formation of the West's eventual opinion that Germany had been the aggressor nation against Belgium. Such facts and conclusions would be repeated for the duration of the war and greatly affect the future involvement of the United States.

Also here in chapter 17 The Flames of Louvain, Tuchman places a selection of German views from a variety of sources as to the aims and desires of Germany. She cites Thomas Mann as saying the goal was "the establishment of the German idea in history, the enthronement of Kultur, the fulfillment of Germany's historical mission". She then conveys American reporter Irvin S. Cobb's account of an interview with a 'German scientist': "Germany [is] for progress. German Kultur will enlighten the world and after this war there will never be another." Yet further, a 'German businessman' opines that the war will give Europe "a new map, and Germany will be at the center of it" (aims similar to the Septemberprogramm). Such outspoken menace worked to solidify opposition to Germany, caused George Bernard Shaw to become "fed up" at Prussian Militarism, and H. G. Wells to condemn the German "war god" and hope for an end to all armed conflict.

Chapter 17's main focus is the German army's atrocities in Belgium, in particular against the historic university city of Louvain. Tuchman frames her remarks by describing the Schrecklichkeit, the German military's "theory of terror". Accordingly, in a failed attempt to suppress the "illegal" franc-tireur (civilians shooting at German troops), hundreds of nearby citizens at several Belgium towns had been executed. Her accounts of the ferocity of such German army reprisals against the general population and of the willful burning of Louvain, such as its university library make it obvious why the Western Allies might feel themselves justified to condemn Germany and Germans wholesale.

==== Ch. 18 – Blue Water, Blockade and the Great Neutral ====
Chapter 18 describes the British fear that since their island nation was dependent on overseas imports, the German navy could manage to disrupt their international trade. Although Britain's navy was superior in ships and experience, perhaps the German navy's "best opportunity for a successful battle was in the first two or three weeks of the war." However, the German High Seas Fleet remained in port and was ordered not to challenge the British warships watching the North Sea. Thus, a substantial control over the world's seaways was then exerted by the British Royal Navy.

Surrounding the neutral role of the United States, diplomatic politicking quickly intensified. On August 6, Washington formally requested the Europeans to agree to follow the 1908 Declaration of London, which "favored the neutrals' right to trade as against the belligerents' right to blockade." Germany agreed. Britain "said Yes and meant No" and supplemented an Order of Council on August 20 (the 100th anniversary of Britain's burning of Washington). Despite the equitable intent of international law, Britain sought to receive supplies from America while its naval blockade of Germany denied the supplies to Germany. Woodrow Wilson had already advised Americans on August 18 to be "neutral in fact as well as in name, impartial in thought as well as in action" so that America might become the "impartial mediator" that could then bring "standards of righteousness and humanity" to the belligerents in order to negotiate "a peace without victory" in Europe. Both wartime paper profits from a nearly fourfold increase in trade with Britain and France and "German folly" eventually would later work to cause American entry into World War I.

==== Ch. 19 – Retreat ====
On August 25, Joffre issued a General Order to form a Sixth Army, which was transported to Amiens to support the British and the French Fourth and Fifth Armies. On August 26, at the Battle of Le Cateau, the 75,000 strong BEF led by Smith-Dorrien lost over 8,000 men but managed to delay the Germans. The French Fifth Army, under Lanrezac, struggled to retreat, regroup, and establish a defensive line; coordination issues and miscommunications with Field Marshal French added to the chaos and confusion. By August 28, German commanders, particularly von Kluck, shifted their focus from cutting off the British to enveloping both the British and French forces, significantly impacting the German campaign's progress. By September 2, the French armies had fallen back 150 miles from their starting positions on August 24; soldiers retreated haggard, hungry, and exhausted, marching past their own homes which they knew Germans would occupy the next day.

==== Ch. 20 – The front is Paris ====
August 29 and 30 proved to be turning points for the French Army. On the 29th, Lanrezac repelled a German attack at the bridge of Guise. However, Joffre, unaware of this success, could only see his Fifth and Sixth Armies in precarious positions and the BEF retreating. During this “most tragic [period] in all of French history” Joffre ordered, in "wonderful calm", generals d’Amade and Lanrezac to pull back and blow up the bridges over the Somme and the Oise. Next day brought worse news: Russia’s Second Army had just been defeated at Tannenberg and 70,000 soldiers taken prisoner. Yet, another intelligence report gave him reason to hope: Moltke had decided to transfer two German corps (70,000 soldiers) from West to East.

Britain also turned a corner at home and on the battlefront. On August 30, the censor F. E. Smith urged The Times to publish Arthur Moore’s Amiens dispatch which detailed Germany’s advances. This powerful recruitment propaganda landed on a public opinion that had been shaped since August 27 by a rumor that 70,000 Russian troops had been transported across Britain to aid French forces. These soldiers were, in fact, “phantom,” but the British public’s hallucination was so strong that it contaminated France, where droves of Parisians gathered at railway stations to welcome these imaginary Cossacks, and Germany, where it influenced the military command at the Marne as much as the actual troop movements. On the military front, Sir John French informed Lord Kitchener on August 29 that he planned to withdraw the BEF behind the Seine due to his waning confidence in the French troops, which were "fall[ing] back right and left of [him …], a militant misstatement of the truth, after Joffre had just finished telling him the opposite." Lord Kitchener was so shocked by the mere idea that the BEF could retreat, a "calamitous" act and "a violation of the spirit of the Entente" that he confronted French at the British Embassy in Paris on September 1 and persuaded him to keep his troops engaged with the French forces. Britain was turning its corner.

As for the German Army, it was now within 30 miles of Paris, so tantalizingly close that it was about to distribute to its soldiers a bronze medal inscribed "Entry of German Troops in Paris – 1871–1914."

==== Ch. 21 – Von Kluck's Turn ====
After defeating Maunoury, Kluck sought to change his strategy, aiming southeast to outflank Lanrezac and close the gap with Bülow. He needed reinforcements, but Moltke, paralyzed by indecision, was focused on three issues: i) failing to capture Paris as scheduled, ii) rumors of 80,000 Russian reinforcements, and iii) widening gaps between his armies, which could only be closed by abandoning the conquest of Nancy and Toul.

Despite Moltke’s hesitation, Kluck acted. Recognizing that Maunoury was defeated, the BEF was absent, and his flank was secure, Kluck decided on August 31 to turn southeast at Bülow's suggestion to cut off the French Vth Army's retreat. Moltke approved the change, eager to resolve the gaps between his forces and maintain the Paris timeline.

However, Kluck’s aggressive nature would lead to his undoing. On September 1, he unexpectedly encountered the BEF at Compiègne and Villers-Cotterêts, but instead of letting them retreat, he pursued them and lost two days. Additionally, he ignored Moltke’s orders to follow the Second Army in echelon, opting to press ahead toward the Marne aiming to drive the French southeastward.

It took the French two days to act on the realization Kluck had turned away from Paris. On August 31, Captain Lepic was surprised to notice two German columns heading toward Compiègne, not Paris. The following day Captain Fagalde found a map on a dead German cavalryman confirming the shift. Acting on this intelligence, Joffre issued General Order No. 4 on September 2, directing the Third, Fourth, and Fifth Armies to retreat toward the Seine and Aube. Once the Fifth Army had evaded encirclement and received reinforcements from eastern France and the mobile units of Paris, they would go on the offensive. Gallieni, now commanding the Sixth Army, ordered Maunoury to destroy the bridges on the Oise and advised the government to evacuate Paris for Bordeaux, which they did on the night of Sedan Day, shocking the public. On September 3, two aviators of Gallieni’s army spotted German columns moving eastward, prompting General Clergerie and Colonel Giraudon to shout: “They offer us their flank!”

==== Ch. 22 – "Gentlemen, We Will Fight on the Marne" ====
Due to communications issues between Kluck’s army and Luxembourg, OHL realized only on September 4 that Kluck had crossed the Marne, thus disobeying their orders of September 2. Kluck’s push reflected the confidence of German officers in their imminent entry into Paris, except for Moltke, who, puzzled by the absence of the usual signs of victory, believed the French were not defeated but retreating to prepare a counteroffensive. Recognizing the vulnerability of Kluck's left flank, which was advancing southeast with an exhausted army and delayed supplies, Moltke considered at last pulling reinforcements from his left wing. He proposed the move to Rupprecht but the Kaiser balked at the idea of weakening the army that could take Nancy. Moltke backed down and ended the day signing the order that would halt Germany's right wing.

Meanwhile, the French Army was turning a corner. Although it continued retreating, Joffre was preparing for the day after. On September 3, he relieved Lanrezac, whom he found depressed, ineffective in collaborating with John French, and prone to criticizing his orders and appointed Franchet d'Esperey to command the 5th Army. On September 4, following a day of solitary reflection, Joffre decided at 6 PM that France would attack on September 7 with the armed forces of Franchet d’Esperey, Foch, Gallieni and French. However these last two upset his plan. Gallieni had already sent preliminary orders to Maunoury to prepare to march on September 4 and thus forced Joffre’s hand to advance the attack to September 6 as he was afraid Maunoury’s move would disclose the whole offensive to the Germans. Joffre was also assuming the BEF would join the offensive but was stunned to learn, after he had issued his order at 8:30 P.M., that John French had decided to wait and see.

Kluck continued disregarding Moltke’s order to retreat and crossed the Grand Morin on September 5. He yielded only after Moltke presented him with evidence that the French were preparing to attack his flank. By then, it was too late. On the Allied side, Joffre motored three hours to the BEF's HQ at Melun, where he urged John French to join the counter-offensive. With tears in his eyes, French agreed to "do all we possibly can." Back at GQG, Joffre ended the day declaring to his assembled officers: "Gentlemen, we will fight on the Marne."

=== Afterword ===
After Maunoury provoked Kluck’s turnabout, a gap opened in the German lines which the Allies failed to exploit as the BEF moved in too slowly and the German Army retreated in time to avoid a piercing. Germany’s much sought after decisive victory was eluding her. Moltke and von Kluck attributed this failure to the unexpected power of the French élan and this “extraordinary and peculiar aptitude of the French soldier to recover quickly, [...] a possibility not studied in our war academy." Beside the morale of the French soldier, six strategic and tactical errors contributed to Germany stalling:

1. two corps were taken out of the Western front and sent East
2. for too long, the German Armies tried enveloping the French First and Second armies by their left wing
3. Kluck outrun its supplies and exhausted its men
4. did not stay level with Bülow
5. and marched back on the Marne instead of forward on the Grand Morin;
6. finally and most importantly, by scheduling a six-week march towards France through Belgium, Germany precipitated three troubles on itself: it had to leave some of its forces behind to fight in Belgium, Britain entered the war with its five divisions and the world opinion turned against it.

These errors alone gave the Allies a numerical superiority, the first since the Battle of the Frontiers. Further, the French generals rose to the challenge: Joffre’s “impregnable confidence” may have held the French Armies together during the 12-day retreat, Gallieni seized on the opportunity to counterattack and Clergerie organized 600 taxis to transport 6,000 troops to the front line. And yet, this did not deliver France a victory either.

The stalemate that ensued "suck[ed] up lives at a rate of 5,000 and sometimes 50,000 a day". In August 1914 alone, France lost 300,000 of its 1.6 million-soldier army. "The deadlock, fixed by the failures of the first month, determined the future course of the war and, as a result, the terms of the peace, the shape of the interwar period, and the conditions of the Second Round." "The Battle of the Marne was one of the decisive battles of the world not because it determined that Germany would ultimately lose or that the Allies ultimately win the war but because it determined that the war would go on. [....] There was no turning back. The nations were caught in a trap, a trap made during the first thirty days out of battles that failed to be decisive, a trap from which there was, and has been, no exit."

== Style / Genre ==
Robert K. Massie, author of the 1994 foreword to the book, attributes its "enormous reputation" to four qualities: "a wealth of vivid detail which keeps the reader immersed in events almost as an eyewitness; a prose style which is transparently clear, intelligent, controlled and witty; a cool detachment of moral judgement – Mrs. Tuchman is never preachy or reproachful: she draws on skepticism, not cynicism, leaving the reader not so much outraged by human villainy as amused and saddened by human folly. These first three qualities are present in all of Barbara Tuchman's work, but in The Guns of August, there is a fourth, which makes the book, once taken up, almost impossible to set aside. Remarkably, she persuades the reader to suspend any foreknowledge of what is about to happen[;] so great is Mrs. Tuchman's skill that the reader forgets what he knows. [...] Mrs. Tuchman's triumph is that she makes the events of August 1914 as suspenseful on the page as they were to the people living through them."

Tuchman knows to find and express "the vivid specific fact which would imprint on the reader's mind the essential nature of the man or event." Some examples follow.

=== Key players ===
Tuchman references almost four hundred actors in The Guns of August, General Joffre being cited the most on 125 different pages. Thirty of them receive a development of their characteristics or background. (Note: From a count of the number of surnames in the index of the book..)

The four excerpts below illustrate Robert K. Massie's remark that Tuchman can "imprint the essential natural of the man":

- Joseph Joffre was "massive and paunchy in his baggy uniform, with a fleshy face adorned by a heavy, nearly white mustache and bushy eyebrows to match with a clear youthful skin, clam blue eyes and a candid, tranquil gaze, Joffre looked like Santa Claus and gave an impression of benevolence and naïveté – two qualities not noticeably part of his character." "Joffre's supreme confidence in himself was expressed [in 1912] when his aide, Major Alexandre, asked him if he thought war was shortly to be expected. "Certainly I think so," Joffre replied. "I have always thought so. It will come. I shall fight and I shall win. I have always succeeded in what I do – as in the Sudan. It will be that way again." "It will mean a Marshal's baton for you," his aide suggested with some awe at the vision. "Yes." Joffre acknowledged the prospect with laconic equanimity."
- "The short, stocky and florid Sir John French, about to take command in the field, was keyed to a pitch of valour and combativeness. His normally apoplectic expression, combined with the tight cavalryman's stock which he affected in place of collar and tie, gave him an appearance of being perpetually on the verge of choking, as indeed he often was emotionally if not physically."
- Vladimir Sukhomlinov was "artful, indolent, pleasure-loving, chubby [...] with an almost feline manner, who, smitten by the twenty-three year old wife of a provincial governor, contrived to get rid of the husband by divorce on framed evidence and marry the beautiful residue as his fourth wife."
- "Tall, heavy, bald and sixty-six years old, Moltke habitually wore an expression of profound distress, which led the Kaiser to call him der traurige Julius (for what might be rendered "Gloomy Gus"; in fact, his name was Helmuth). Poor health, for which he took an annual cure at Karlsbad, and the shadow of a great uncle were perhaps cause for gloom."

Aside these four men, Tuchman characterises or gives the background of twenty-seven actors:

- France: Joseph Gallieni, Louis Franchet d'Espèrey, Augustin Dubail, Adolphe Messimy, Raymond Poincaré, Noël de Castelnau, Michel-Joseph Maunoury and Fernand de Langle de Cary;
- Germany: Eric Ludendorff, Alfred von Schlieffen ("of the two classes of Prussian officer, the bullnecked and the wasp-waisted, he belonged to the second"), Max Hoffmann, Friedrich von Bernhardi, Alexander von Kluck, Crown Prince Rupprecht, Crown Prince Wilhelm, Paul von Hindenburg, Maximilian von Prittwitz and Hermann von François;
- Britain: Jackie Fisher, Sir Edward Grey, Sir Henry Wilson and Ernest Troubridge;
- Russia: Grand Duke Nicholas, Nicholas II and Alexander Samsonov;
- Belgium: King Albert.

It is worth noting those actors Tuchman cites often but does not characterise, if only with a few well chosen words:

- France: Ferdinand Foch, Charles Lanrezac
- Germany: Kaiser Wilhelm II ("possessor of the least inhibited tongue in Europe"), Theobald von Bethmann Hollweg, Max von Hausen, Karl von Bülow, Wilhelm Souchon
- Britain: Winston Churchill, Kitchener, H. H. Asquith, Richard Haldane, Archibald Murray.

=== Key events ===
The introductory paragraph of A funeral, the first chapter of The Guns of August, took Barbara Tuchman "eight hours to complete and became the most famous passage in all her work". The Canadian historian Margaret MacMillan "was gripped from her wonderful first sentence":

So gorgeous was the spectacle on the May morning of 1910 when nine kings rode in the funeral of Edward VII of England that the crowd, waiting in hushed and black-clad awe, could not keep back gasps of admiration.

— Barbara W. Tuchman

One of the key events took place on August 1. "In Berlin just after five o'clock a telephone rang in the Foreign Office. [...] "Moltke wants to know whether things can start." At that moment, [...] a telegram, from Prince Lichnowsky, ambassador in London, reported an English offer, as Lichnowsky understood it, "that in case we did not attack France, England would remain neutral and would guarantee France's neutrality." [...] The Kaiser clutched at Lichnowsky's passport to a one-front war. Minutes counted. Already mobilization was rolling inexorably toward the French frontier. The first hostile act [...] was scheduled within an hour. It must be stopped, stopped at once. But how? Where was Moltke? Moltke had left the palace. An aide was sent off with siren screaming, to intercept him. He was brought back. The Kaiser was himself again, the All-Highest, the War Lord, blazing with a new idea, planning, proposing, disposing. He read Moltke the telegram and said in a triumph: "Now we can go to war against Russia only. We simply march the whole of our Army to the East!" Aghast at the thought of his marvelous machinery of mobilization wrenched into reverse, Moltke refused point-blank. For the past ten years, first as assistant to Schlieffen, then as his successor, Moltke's job had been planning for this day. The Day, Der Tag, for which all Germany's energies were gathered, on which the march to final mastery of Europe would begin. It weighed upon him with an oppressive, almost unbearable responsibility. [...] "Your Majesty," Moltke told him now, "it cannot be done. The deployment of millions cannot be improvised. [...] Those arrangements took a whole year of intricate labor to complete" – and Moltke closed upon that rigid phrase, the basis for every major German mistake, the phrase that launched the invasion of Belgium and the submarine war against the United States, the inevitable phrase when military plans dictate policy – "and once settled it cannot be altered."

== Analysis ==
=== Miscalculations leading to war ===
Throughout the aforementioned narrative, Tuchman constantly brings up a theme: the numerous misconceptions, miscalculations, and mistakes that she believed resulted in the tragedy of trench warfare, such as:

- Economic miscalculation: Tuchman says both European intellectuals and leaders overestimated the power of free trade. They believed that the interconnectedness of European nations through trade would stop a continent-wide war from breaking out, as the economic consequences would be too great. However, the assumption was incorrect. For example, Tuchman noted that Moltke, when warned of such consequences, refused to even consider them in his plans, arguing he was a "soldier," not an "economist."
- Unfounded belief in quick warfare: except for a very few politicians (who were at the time ridiculed and excluded because of their views, with only Lord Kitchener having the authority to act on his anticipation of a long war), all the leaders of the major combatants believed the war would be concluded in a matter of weeks, certainly by the end of 1914. Tuchman recounted the story of a British statesman who, after he warned others that the war might last two or three years, was branded a "pessimist." That false assumption had disastrous effects, especially on logistics (see below).
- Over-reliance on morale and the offensive: Tuchman details, in depth, how the leaders of the major powers, before the war, developed a philosophy of warfare based almost entirely on morale, a constant offensive, and retaining the initiative. Joffre, in particular, refused to consider going on the defensive/or even to slow the offensive, even when the realities of the battlefield demonstrated that his approach was not working.
- Failure to consider political backlash: many war planners did not take into consideration the political and treaty-based consequences of their offensive actions. As Tuchman argues, the German leaders in particular refused to consider the consequences of moving their armies into Belgium despite that country's neutrality. Despite Moltke's concerns, German generals insisted on moving through Belgium because they needed to maneuver. They failed (or refused) to realize that by invading Belgium, they effectively forced Britain to declare war because of existing treaties and national honor.
- Failure to consider adverse societal moral effects: this war as many others produced its fair amount of individual vanity and insubordination. However, the German political leaders failed to consider that some military acts can have a wider moral repercussion, which in turn can translate adversely on the military front; this is clear from the sack of Louvain, which led to public outrage and contributed to the US entering the war.
- Outdated forms of wartime etiquette: although the technology, aims, methods, and plans of World War I were significantly different from earlier wars, military leaders in occupied territories continued to have an expectation of a form of martial etiquette from civilians, regarding co-operation and obedience of instructions, as a reciprocal part of non-combatant status; which increased resentment between the citizens of the opposing nations. To illustrate, Tuchman repeatedly uses quotes from the diaries of German generals who commandeered the homes and supplies of civilians. One recurrent theme in their diary entries was that they simply could not understand why the property owners refused full co-operation, in line with traditional wartime courtesy. In a somewhat comical passage, Tuchman even quotes from a general who criticized the master of a Belgian house for failing to sit with him at dinner and observe proper mealtime etiquette despite the fact that the Germans had violated his country's neutrality, taken over his house, and stolen or destroyed much of his property. Similar problems occurred in the practical application of submarine, and later aerial, warfare.

Overall, Tuchman argues that while some of the war's major combatants looked forward to a war, specifically Germany and Austria-Hungary, all of them expected it to be a short one, and none of them desired or anticipated a prolonged war. Likewise, she argues that even successes, such as the First Battle of the Marne, a French victory, were to some extent accidental victories that were won despite, and not because of, military leadership or strategy.

== Development ==
The Guns of August is Tuchman's third book, after Bible and Sword, published in 1956, and The Zimmermann Telegram, in 1958, (Note: If one counts The Lost British Policy, published in 1938, The Guns of August is actually Tuchman's fourth published work. However, Tuchman herself did not mention it.) and by her own account "the genesis of this book lies in [these] two earlier books I wrote, of which the First World War was the focal point of both. […] I had always thought that 1914 was the hour when the clock struck, so to speak, the date that ended the nineteenth century and began our own age, "the Terrible Twentieth" as Churchill called it. I felt that 1914 was it. But I did not know what should be the gateway or the framework." She was approached by Cecil Scott of MacMillan who asked her to write a book on 1914, particularly on the battle of Mons and on "how had the BEF thrown back the Germans [and whether] they [had] really seen the vision of an angel over the battlefield." But Tuchman was more interested in writing a book on the escape of the German cruiser Goeben from the Royal Navy's Gloucester, an event that would precipitate the Ottoman Empire into the war and for which she had personal affinity. But Mr Scott was not interested in that episode. In the end, "I formed the plan of keeping to the war's first month, which contained all the roots, including the Goeben and Battle of Mons, to make us both happy."

Tuchman had a personal connection to the Goeben episode since she was present, as a child aged two, with her parents on a small steamer from which they witnessed the pursuit: "That morning [August 10, 1914] there arrived in Constantinople the small Italian passenger steamer which had witnessed the Gloucester's action against Goeben and Breslau. Among its passengers were the daughter, son-in-law and three grandchildren of the American ambassador Mr. Henry Morgenthau." Being the grandchild of Henry Morgenthau, she is referring to herself as she confirmed in 1981 in her book Practicing History, in which she tells the story of her father, Maurice Wertheim, who was traveling from Constantinople to Jerusalem on August 29, 1914, to deliver funds to the Jewish community there. This connection, and her initial desire to write a book on the episode, might explain why two academic reviewers found this chapter "long and somewhat awkward" and "out of context".

Tuchman creates by combining the standard method of academic history, which is to read authentic, original material with activities more readily associated with journalism, such as field trips. Thus, to write The Guns of August, she read "letters, telegrams, diaries, memoirs, cabinet documents, battle orders, secret codes, and billets-doux [found in] the New York Public Library, the Library of Congress, the National Archives, the British Library and Public Record Office, the Bibliothèque Nationale, the Sterling Library at Yale and the Widener Library at Harvard, [and] rented a small Renault and toured the battlefield of Belgium and France ."

== Reception ==
In 1988, in her preface to the twenty-sixth anniversary of the book's second edition, Tuchman recounts how positive the reviews were when the book was published in 1962. Since she was "hardly known to the critics […] with no reputation for them to enjoy smashing, the book received instead the warmest reception." One review in particular brought her to tears because it "elicit[ed] perfect comprehension": Clifton Fadiman's critic in the Book-of-the-Month Club Bulletin. He wrote that The Guns of August had "a fair chance [to] turn to be a historical classic" by displaying "almost Thucydidean virtues: intelligence, concision, weight, detachment. […] It is [Tuchman's] conviction that the deadlock of the terrible month of August determined the future course of the war and the terms of the peace, the shape of the inter-war period and the conditions of the Second Round. […] [O]ne of the marks of the superior historian is the ability to project human beings as well as events." In 1962, Publishers Weekly predicted the book "will be the biggest new nonfiction seller in your winter season", which greatly surprised Tuchman but "as it turned out, they were right."

Indeed, all reviewers have praised her narrative style, even the academic historians who have raised a few pointed critiques to The Guns of August because Tuchman had erected a rigid, deterministic thesis by relying too heavily on sources that corroborated it, ignoring, misrepresenting or downplaying factors that undermined it and veiling it with an anti-German veneer, which could be partially explained by the context of her writing as 1962 was probably the height of the Cold War.

=== A unanimous praise of Tuchman's narrative style ===
The academic reviews of The Guns of August were published in two waves: for the first edition in 1962–63, and in 2013–14 on the hundredth anniversary of the start of the war and the associated 2014 re-edition of the book. Over these fifty years, Tuchman's narrative style has been constantly praised:

- In 1962, the American historian Harold J. Gordon points out half a dozen major flaws but imparts in closing that Tuchman "brings together materials from a great many sources and binds them skilfully into a clear and understandable account." Fellow Samuel J. Hurwitz lauds her for writing "imaginatively, vividly, and even passionately, [with] a talent for making scenes of the past come alive, and the result is perhaps even larger than life." Professor John W. Oliver praises her ability to put the "reader [in] a box seat as he watches the opening drama." In 1963, Ulrich Trumpener, Professor at the University of Alberta, despite writing a very critical review of her book, notes that "in terms of sheer narrative power, The Guns of August is an admirable work."
- The American historian Samuel R. Williamson Jr. starts his 2013 critical review by praising "her narrative style [which] gives the reader a sense of intimacy with the events" and closes it by quoting Harvard Professor Sidney Fay's: "she had got the history wrong, but historians need to write like Tuchman or we will be out of business." In 2014, the Canadian historian Margaret MacMillan, Professor of International History at the University of Oxford, "was gripped from her wonderful first sentence. "So gorgeous was the spectacle on the May morning of 1910 when nine kings rode in the funeral of Edward VII of England that the crowd, waiting in hushed and black-clad awe, could not keep back gasps of admiration." She adds further "When I first read Barbara Tuchman's The Guns of August in the autumn of 1963 it was as though history went from black and white to Technicolor", Tuchman has this "ability to bring the past to life, in part using what she called the corroborative detail" and is a "wonderful storyteller"; lastly MacMillan loves her "acerbic wit" and "sharp character sketches."

=== A deterministic thesis erected on biased views framed by the Cold War ===
The determinism of Tuchman's thesis has been best expressed by two academic historians fifty years apart. In 1962, Professor Oron J. Hale of the University of Virginia was concerned by how Tuchman connects in a deterministic manner events that are several years, even several decades apart. He provides two such examples:

- "The naval side is inadequate [with] a chapter [out of context] on the British navy's hunt for the German cruisers Goeben and Breslau in the Mediterranean and their escape to Constantinople. In a dubious chain of causation we are told that the Russian declaration of war on Turkey, in November, followed by Gallipoli, Suez, Palestine, the breakup of the Ottoman Empire, and "the subsequent history of the Middle East, followed from the voyage of the Goeben."
- He concludes his review by noting that Tuchman's "thesis that the failure of Plan 17 and the Schlieffen Plan, which produced stalemate in the West, was the mold that determined the future course of the war, the conditions of peace and of the inter-war period, as well as the "Second Round," is much too deterministic. The First World War – indeed all major wars – had many turning points. The year 1917, which brought Russian withdrawal and United States entry, was more decisive for the military outcome and the nature of the peace than was 1914."

In 2014, Margaret MacMillan, who was greatly influenced by the book, ends her positive review on a similar note: "her main argument that entangling alliances and rigid military timetables caught Europe in a grip that led the powers inexorably towards catastrophe is no longer accepted by most historians."

This determinism is the result of four biases: i) the sources and historical research Tuchman relies upon, ii) the events she decided to exclude from her book, iii) the factors that she downplayed as they were weakening the strength of her thesis and iv) the bias she had against Germans, which is partially explained by v) the timing of the book, written in 1962 at the height of the Cold War.

=== Ignoring historical sources and research, and relying solely on key actors' memories ===
Tuchman has ignored the major works on the origins of the war written by Sidney Fay, Luigi Albertini, Pierre Renouvin, Bernadotte Schmitt, George Gooch and William Langer. As Professor Gordon notes: "Forty years of historical research are ignored as the hundreds of thousands of documents that have been published by the governments of Europe." He is echoed by Professor Trumpener: "A wider utilization of primary sources would have been desirable. For example, neither the Russian and Italian document collection published since 1918 nor the captured German government files, a valuable new source, seem to have been consulted." Instead, as Professor Hale concludes, she relied on "controversial sources [i.e. retrospective works by statesmen and soldiers], which in many instances are not evaluated critically, rather than upon the solid general staff operational histories of the respective military establishments."

=== Misrepresenting key military events ===
There is a noticeable disbalance between the minimal treatment, when mentioned at all, of the key diplomatic and military events that took place in the Balkans and on the Austro-Russian fronts on one side, and the over-emphasis of the naval chases in the Mediterranean on the other. When it comes to the first Tuchman has disregarded in particular three developments:

- The Galician front – Although Tuchman recognizes that omitting the Austro-Hungarian / Serbian / Russian front was "not entirely arbitrary" and resulted from her decisions to strictly confine the book to August 1914, preserve "unity" and avoid "tiresome length", a few historians deplored these choices. For Professor Williamson, this "seems unforgivable [for] there would have been no war in the West if the Russians had not decided [...] to intervene in the war on behalf of Serbia and thus attack the Habsburg monarchy." Professor Hale challenges Tuchman on the rigidity of her time frame: "[d]uring the first week of September, concurrently with the battle of the Marne, massive Russian-Austrian engagements were fought in Galicia, with results as decisive and casualties equal to those of the campaigns in France or East Prussia. All this is excluded with consequent distortion." Professor Trumpener even wonders whether it is "not obscuring some crucial issues to treat the opening Austro-Hungarian campaigns against Serbs and Russians [...] as mere side shows."
- The Austrian war plan – As a direct consequence of voluntarily ignoring the Galician front "[t]he Austrian war plan is entirely ignored and the Russian merely touched upon."
- The outbreak of the war – Oron J. Hale was "disturbed [by] the fragmented treatment of the outbreak of war. [...] The war originated in the Balkans [...] and from a local crisis grew into a general European war through the reckless diplomatic and military actions of Austrian and Russian authorities."

On the other hand, the chapter 10 dedicated to the Gloucester's chase of the Goeben and the Breslau in the Mediterranean is "long and somewhat awkward", "inadequate", "out of context" and contains "numerous inaccuracies and over-simplifications."

=== Downplaying key factors ===
Professor Gordon points out that Tuchman's excessive focus on Germans' villainy led her to pay "[l]ittle more than passing mention, if that, [..] to universally operating forces as nationalism, imperialism, trade rivalries, and militarism, in creating a situation where war was an increasingly acceptable solution for the problems of Europe." Professor Williamson adds: "Issues of civil-military relations, alliance structures, and the coordination of military planning receive Tuchman's modest attention at most. The role of the public opinion is only fleetingly mentioned, and economic preparation for war, though noted, gets nothing more."

=== Anti-German bias ===
For Trumpener, Tuchman's treatment of imperial Germany is "blatantly one-sided." Tuchman, according to Trumpener, transforms "the Germans of 1914 into a nation of barbarians [...] invariably unpleasant, hysterical, or outright brutish [...] The armies, marching like 'predatory ants' across Belgium, soon reveal 'the beast beneath the German skin'. [...] Suffice it to add that one of the German generals, Alexander von Kluck, duly emerges as a 'grim-visaged Attila' and that the Prussian officer corps is, in any case, composed exclusively of 'bullnecked' or 'wasp-waisted' types."

Gordon (1962) concurs with Trumpener's assessment: "The impression given is that the war was half the result of the fecklessness of the Kaiser and half the result of the unbelievably vicious character of the German people, who forced the war upon an innocent and peace-loving civilized world. [...] Mrs Tuchman's hostility to all things German also seems to have led her to ignore such crucial developments as the Russian agreement not to mobilize against Germany and its violation."

Fifty years later, MacMillan (2014) is less stringent in her criticism of Tuchman's negative preconceived opinion of Germans, merely stating that "[s]he is prone at times to absurd overstatements, for example that the German people were gripped by the idea that divine providence had destined them to be masters of the universe."

=== The context of the Cold War ===
Professor MacMillan continues explaining Tuchman's anti-German bias as a consequence of "[h]er view that the Germans somehow wanted to impose their culture on the world [which] is surely a reflection of that great ideological struggle of her own time between the west and the Soviet bloc." Indeed, as professor Williamson, concurs: "By 1962 America's strategic position had been significantly altered. The Soviet arsenal of nuclear missiles made the possibility of war increasingly likely. [...] Later in 1962, the Cuban crisis showed just how dangerous the chances of war might be. Not surprisingly leaders, writers and commentators looked back to 1914 to analyze what had gone wrong. [...] The American public firmly believed that the Germans were solely responsible for the Great War [...] a view of course reaffirmed by German behavior in the Second World War. "

== Publication ==
The first edition was published by MacMillan the last week of January 1962 and it stayed on the best seller list for more than forty weeks. A second edition came out in 1988, for the seventieth anniversary of the armistice, with the author's preface. In 1994, a third edition was published for the eightieth anniversary of the start of the war; Robert K. Massie wrote the foreword; it was published in the US by Random House and in Great Britain by Penguin Books.

By April 2024, The Guns of August has been translated in (at least) 19 languages: Bulgarian, Chinese, Czech, Dutch, Estonian, Finnish, French, German, Hebrew, Italian, Japanese, Persian, Polish, Portuguese, Romanian, Russian, Spanish, Swedish and Turkish.

== Legacy ==
=== Cultural impact ===
The book was an immediate bestseller and was on the bestseller list of The New York Times for 42 consecutive weeks. The Pulitzer Prize nomination committee was unable to award it the prize for outstanding history because Joseph Pulitzer's will specifically stated that the recipient of the Pulitzer Prize for History must be a book on American history. Instead, Tuchman was given the prize for general nonfiction.

According to the cover notes of an audio version of The Guns of August, "[President John F. Kennedy] was so impressed by the book, he gave copies to his cabinet and principal military advisers, and commanded them to read it." In his book One Minute to Midnight about the Cuban Missile Crisis, Michael Dobbs notes the deep impression Guns had on Kennedy. He often quoted from it and wanted "every officer in the Army" to read it as well. Subsequently, "[t]he secretary of the Army sent copies to every U.S. military base in the world. Kennedy drew from The Guns of August to help in dealing with the crisis in Cuba, including the profound and unpredictable implications a rapid escalation of the situation could have. Robert S. McNamara, United States Secretary of Defense during Kennedy's presidency, recalled that "[e]arly in his administration, President Kennedy asked his cabinet officials and members of the National Security Council" to read The Guns of August. McNamara related that Kennedy said The Guns of August graphically portrayed how Europe's leaders had bungled into the debacle of World War I, and that Kennedy later told his cabinet officials that "We are not going to bungle into war."

The British Prime Minister Harold Macmillan, who had served on the Western Front during the First World War, was also profoundly affected by the book. In his diary for Monday, 22 October 1962, he wrote:

Washington, in a rather panicky way, have been urging a NATO 'alert' with all that this implies (in our case, a Royal Proclamation and the call up of Reservists). I told him that we do not repeat not agree at this stage. N. [General Norstad] agreed with this and said he thought NATO powers would take the same view. I said that 'mobilization' had sometimes caused war. Here it was absurd since the additional forces made available by 'Alert' had no military significance.

Graham Allison, a political scientist who covered the Cuban Missile Crisis in Essence of Decision, noted the effect of Tuchman's book on Kennedy, but also its implications for the proper study of decision-making and warfare. Allison created an entire model of decision-making, which he called the Organizational Process Model, based on such issues as those covered by Tuchman, a model that directly countered game theory and other rationalistic means of explaining events.

=== Film adaptation ===
The book was the basis for a 1964 documentary film, also titled The Guns of August. The 99-minute film, which premiered in New York City on December 24, 1964, was produced and directed by Nathan Kroll, narrated by Fritz Weaver (with the narration written by Arthur B. Tourtellot), and released by Universal Pictures. It used film footage found in government archives in Paris, London, Brussels, Berlin, and Washington, DC.
