= Henri Beaudenom de Lamaze =

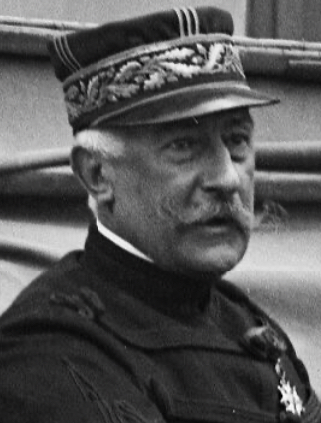
- General de Lamaze in 1906
- Born: May 1, 1848; Paris
- Died: December 14, 1938 (aged 90); Versailles
- Burial place: Montmartre Cemetery
- Education: École polytechnique Superior School of Warfare
- Military career
- Service years: 1869–1915
- Rank: Divisional General
- Conflicts: First Battle of the Marne; First Battle of the Aisne

Henri Beaudenom de Lamaze (ɑ̃ʁi bodənɔ̃ də lamaz, 1848–1938) was a French general. At the start of the First World War, he commanded the right wing of General Maunoury’s 6th Army during the Battle of the Marne and the Battle of the Aisne.

== Career ==
- 1867: Student at the École polytechnique.
- 1869: Second lieutenant at the École d'application de l'artillerie et du génie (artillery and engineering training school).
- 1870: Mobilised for the Franco-Prussian War, he took part in the battles of Châtillon, Malmaison, Champigny and Mont Valérien.
- 1871: Lieutenant in the Versailles Army during the Paris Commune.
- 1872: Saumur Cavalry School.
- 1873: Captain of artillery in Orléans.
- 1877: Staff officer in Toulouse.
- 1879: Superior School of Warfare.
- 1881: Infantry Staff officer in Saint-Malo.
- 1882: Paris Military Government Staff officer.
- 1889: Cavalry division artillery command at Fontainebleau.
- 1898: Colonel of artillery.
- 1903: Brigadier General commanding the 9th Army Corps’s cavalry.
- 1905: Chief of artillery, 10th Army Corps.
- 1910: Divisional General commanding the Nice infantry.
- 1913: Age limit reached.

== WWI ==
He returned to service at the age of 66 on August 24, 1914, three weeks after the outbreak of the First World War, as the Germans approached Paris. General Gallieni, military governor of Paris, placed a group of 30,000 men under the command of General de Lamaze. He was incorporated into the 6th Army of his friend General Maunoury.

On the morning of September 5, 1914, the 6th Army faced General von Kluck's 1st Army near Meaux. To Lamaze’s right, six divisions led by John French, the head of the British Expeditionary Force, filled the gap with the 5th Army. The line of defense extended over 200 kilometers to Verdun. On this first day of the Battle of the Marne, Joffre ordered the 6th Army to push the Germans back beyond the Ourcq before sunset. At midday, on the right wing, General de Lamaze's troops advanced towards Monthyon, where they were met by General von Gronau’s IV Reserve Corps. Poet Charles Péguy, a lieutenant in Lamaze's group, was killed at Villeroy.

On September 6, 1914, like the other French generals, Beaudenom de Lamaze received Joffre's famous order to "get killed on the spot rather than retreat". Braving enemy artillery, his men confronted the Heer in bayonet combat. On the 7th, Gallieni visited Lamaze on Monthyon hill, from where he saw the enemy "marmites" (large-caliber bombshells releasing thick black, orange and violet smoke on impact). The superiority of German heavy artillery was confirmed.

On the night of September 7–8, a division of Zouaves and Algerian-Moroccan Tirailleurs arrived to reinforce Lamaze's group. The battlefield was now near Étrépilly. In the afternoon, the British advanced as far as La Ferté-sous-Jouarre, forcing the Germans to withdraw. The victory of the Marne was followed by the Race to the Sea. Maunoury's 6th Army set off in pursuit of Kluck, who marched northeast towards Soissons, crossed the Aisne and set up a defensive position.

On September 16, Lamaze's Moroccan brigade broke through a number of enemy barricades north of Soissons. Orders were given to fortify their new positions, which resisted a counter-offensive the following day. On the 20th, Maunoury ordered an offensive on the Chemin des Dames, which failed in fog and mud. Ammunition began to run low, and the spectacular progress of the enemy's defensive works became apparent. It was the beginning of trench warfare.

Beaudenom de Lamaze set up his headquarters at the Château de Belleu. Over the following weeks, the General Staff stressed the need to consolidate the position north of Soissons, by extending the breakthrough achieved by the Moroccan brigade to secure this part of the front. Lamaze expressed his reluctance, fearing that such an attack, for lack of resources, would trigger an immediate response that would jeopardize the very maintenance of his positions. Maunoury made several visits to the Château de Belleu to try to convince him, but Lamaze categorically refused. The Grand Quartier Général withdrew him from the front on November 21, 1914. Maunoury told cryptologist Georges Painvin: "I realized that my poor friend de Lamaze was getting old.”

The offensive was led by General Berthelot in the second week of January 1915 and, as Lamaze had predicted, resulted in a French retreat and heavy losses. Criticized after the "Soissons affair", General Joffre fired Berthelot. Beaudenom de Lamaze commanded the southern zone of Paris until December 1915.

== After the War ==
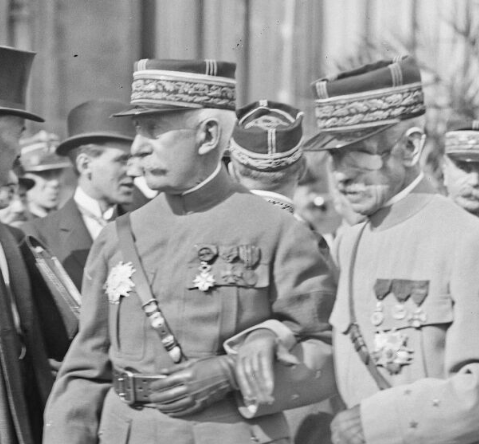
General de Lamaze in 1921 (guiding General Maunoury).

Georges Painvin praised the loyal friendship of Beaudenom de Lamaze, who frequently visited Maunoury, blind and disfigured since March 1915. Several years after Maunoury's death, Lamaze confided to Painvin that they had not discussed the “Soissons affair” since 1914.

Henri Beaudenom de Lamaze died on December 14, 1938, at his home in Versailles. His body was buried in the Montmartre Cemetery. He was married to Cécile de la Croix-Vaubois (1852–1918), daughter of General de la Croix-Vaubois and descendant of Comte de Vaubois. He was the grandfather of Jacques Beaudenom de Lamaze, a Companion of the Liberation killed at the Battle of Bir Hakeim.

== Decorations ==
- Grand Officer of the Legion of Honour
- Inter-Allied Victory Medal
- War Cross 1914-1918
- Commemorative medal of the 1870–1871 War
- 1914–1918 Commemorative war medal
