= Great Retreat =

Fighting retreat by Allied forces early in the First World War

- Part of the Western Front of the First World War
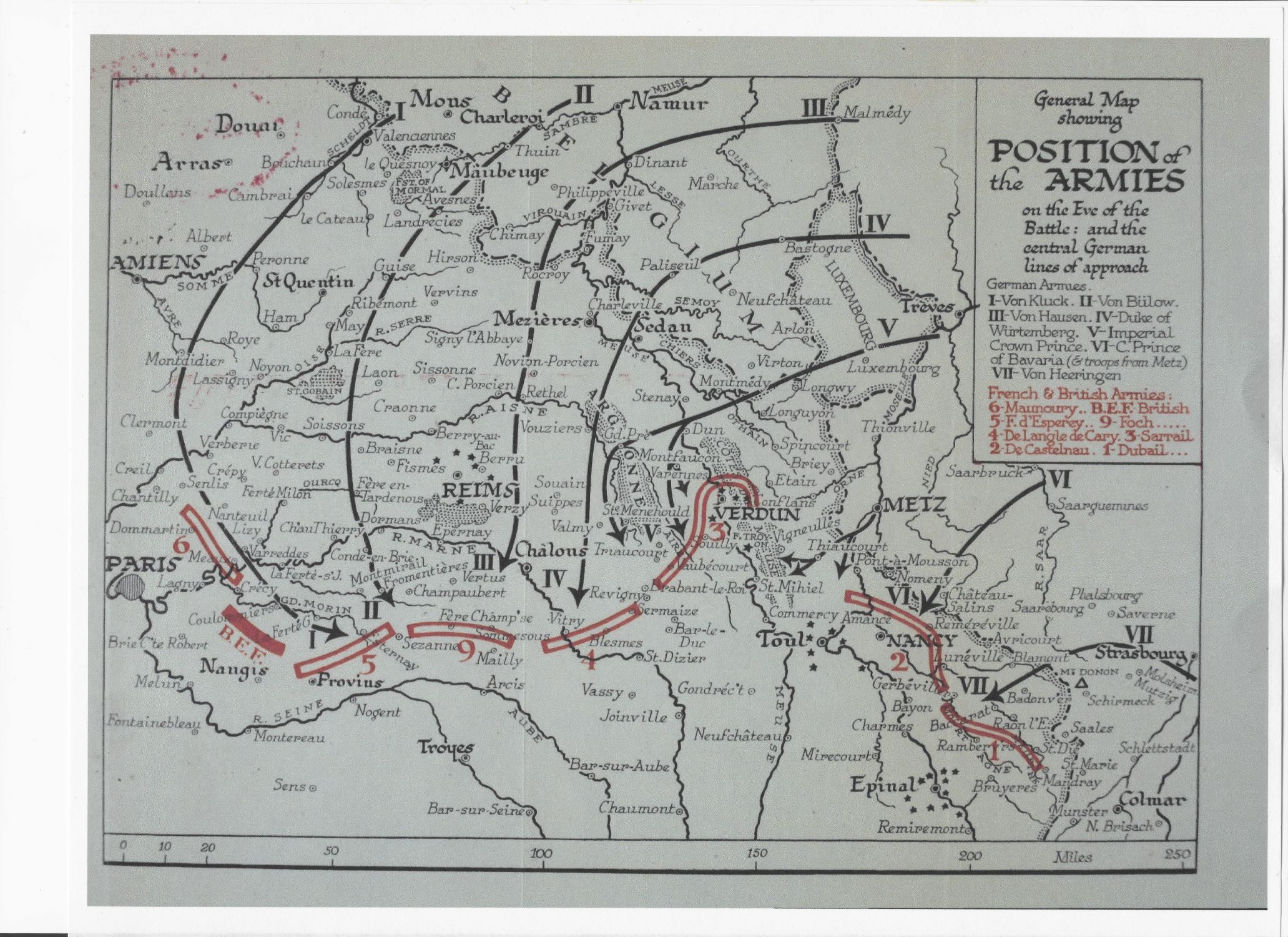
- The Great retreat 23 August – 5 September, from the border of Belgium to east of Paris.
Date	24 August – 5 September 1914
Location	From Mons, Belgium to River Marne, France 49°30′N 02°50′E
Result	German victory
Territorial changes	Allied forces retreated to a line Verdun–Rheims–Paris

Belligerents
France; (United Kingdom of Great Britain and Ireland) United Kingdom	German Empire

Commanders and leaders
(French Third Republic) Joseph Joffre; (United Kingdom of Great Britain and Ireland) John French	(German Empire) Helmuth von Moltke the Younger

The Great Retreat (French: Grande Retraite) also known as the retreat from Mons, took place in the First World War. The retreat was more than 200 km (120 mi), from Belgium to the River Marne in France in August and September 1914. The French Fifth Army and the British Expeditionary Force had been defeated by the armies of the German Empire at the Battle of Charleroi (21 August) and the Battle of Mons (23 August). A counter-offensive by the Fifth Army, with some assistance from the BEF, at the First Battle of Guise (Battle of St. Quentin, 29–30 August) failed to halt the German advance. The retreat of the Fifth Army and the BEF continued to the south side of the Marne River. From 5 to 12 September, the First Battle of the Marne ended the Allied retreat and forced the German armies to retire towards the Aisne River and to fight the First Battle of the Aisne (13–28 September). Reciprocal attempts to outflank the opposing armies to the north known as the Race to the Sea followed from 17 September to 17 October.

== Background ==
=== Battle of the Frontiers, 7 August – 13 September ===
The Battle of the Frontiers is a general name for all of the operations of the French armies until the Battle of the Marne. A series of encounter battles began between the German, French and Belgian armies on the German–French frontier and in southern Belgium on 4 August 1914. The Battle of Mulhouse (Battle of Alsace 7–10 August) was the first French offensive of the First World War. The French captured Mulhouse until forced out by a German counter-attack on 11 August, falling back toward Belfort. The main French offensive, the Battle of Lorraine (14–25 August), began with the Battles of Morhange and Sarrebourg (14–20 August) advances by the First Army on Sarrebourg and the Second Army towards Morhange. Château Salins near Morhange was captured on 17 August and Sarrebourg the next day. The German 6th and 7th armies counter-attacked on 20 August, the Second Army was forced back from Morhange and the First Army was repulsed at Sarrebourg. The German armies crossed the border and advanced on Nancy but were stopped to the east of the city.

France, Germany, Luxembourg and Belgium, 1914

To the south the French retook Mulhouse on 19 August and then withdrew. On 24 August at the Battle of the Mortagne (14–25 August), a limited German offensive in the Vosges, the Germans managed a small advance, before a French counter-attack retook the ground. By 20 August a German counter-offensive in Lorraine had begun and the German 4th Army and 5th Army advanced through the Ardennes on 19 August towards Neufchâteau. An offensive by French Third Army and Fourth Army through the Ardennes began on 20 August, in support of the French invasion of Lorraine. The opposing armies met in thick fog and the French mistook the German troops for screening forces. On 22 August the Battle of the Ardennes (21–28 August) began with French attacks, which were costly to both sides and forced the French into a disorderly retreat late on 23 August. The Third Army recoiled towards Verdun, pursued by the 5th Army and the Fourth Army retreated to Sedan and Stenay. Mulhouse was recaptured again by German forces and the Battle of the Meuse 26–28 August), caused a temporary halt of the German advance.

Liège was occupied by the Germans on 7 August, the first units of the BEF landed in France and French troops crossed the German frontier. On 12 August, the Battle of Haelen was fought by German and Belgian cavalry and infantry and was a Belgian defensive success. The BEF completed its move of four divisions and a cavalry division to France on 16 August, as the last Belgian fort of the Position fortifiée de Liège surrendered. The Belgian government withdrew from Brussels on 18 August and the Germans attacked the Belgian field army at the Battle of the Gete. Next day the Belgian army began to retire towards Antwerp, which left the route to Namur open; Longwy and Namur were besieged on 20 August. Further west, the Fifth Army had concentrated on the Sambre by 20 August, facing north on either side of Charleroi and east towards the Belgian fortress of Namur. On the left, the Cavalry Corps (General André Sordet) linked with the BEF at Mons.

== Prelude ==
=== Battle of Charleroi, 21 August ===
By 20 August, the Fifth Army had begun to concentrate on a 40 km (25 mi) front along the Sambre, centred on Charleroi and extending east to the Belgian fortress of Namur. On the left flank, the Sordet Cavalry Corps linked the Fifth Army to the British Expeditionary Force (BEF) at Mons. General Joseph Joffre ordered Lanrezac to attack across the Sambre but this attack was forestalled by the German 2nd Army on the morning of 21 August, which crossed the Sambre, establishing two bridgeheads which the French, lacking artillery, were unable to reduce. Bülow attacked again on 22 August with three corps against the Fifth Army front. Fighting continued on 23 August, when the French centre around Charleroi began to fall back. The German 3rd Army crossed the Meuse and launched an attack against the French right flank, held by I Corps (General Louis Franchet d'Esperey). The French stopped the German advance and delivered a counter-attack. The Fifth Army was confronted by the German 3rd Army and 2nd Army from the east and the north. Before the Fifth Army could attack over the Sambre the 2nd Army attacked at the Battle of Charleroi and at Namur on 21 August. The 3rd Army crossed the Meuse and attacked the French right flank and on 23 August, the Fifth Army began a retirement southwards, to avoid encirclement.

=== Battle of Mons, 23 August ===
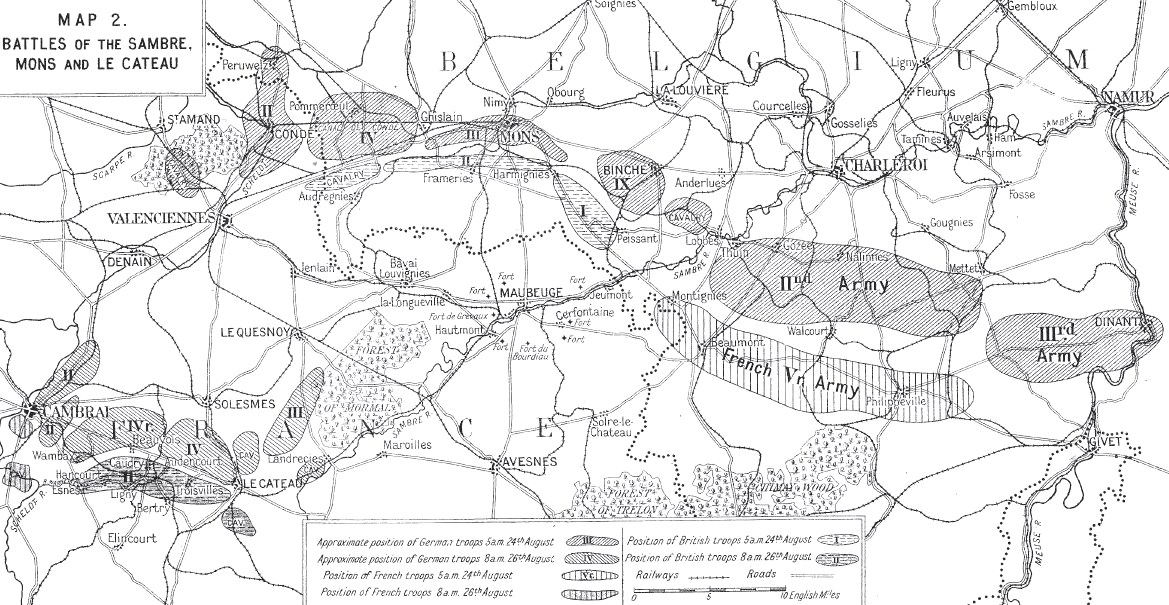
Dispositions: Battles of Mons and Charleroi, 21–23 August 1914

The Battle of Mons was a subsidiary action of the Battle of the Frontiers; the BEF attempted to hold the line of the Mons–Condé Canal against the advancing German 1st Army. During 23 August the Germans concentrated on the British at the salient formed by a loop in the canal. At 9:00 a.m., the Germans attempted to cross four bridges over the canal at the salient. By the afternoon the British position in the salient had become untenable; to the east, units of the German IX Corps had begun to cross the canal, threatening the British right flank. At 3:00 p.m. the 3rd Division was ordered to retire from the salient to positions a short distance to the south of Mons. A retreat was ordered towards evening by the 5th Division to conform and by nightfall II Corps had established a new defensive line, running through the villages of Montrœul, Boussu, Wasmes, Paturages and Frameries. The Germans had built pontoon bridges over the canal and were approaching the British positions in great strength. By nightfall on 24 August, the British had retreated to defensive lines on the Valenciennes–Maubeuge road. Outnumbered by the 1st Army and with the French Fifth Army also falling back, the BEF continue to retire. The I Corps retreated to Landrecies and II Corps to Le Cateau. The British suffered 1,642 casualties, the Germans 2,000.

== Retreat, 24 August – 1 September ==
=== Battle of Le Cateau ===
On the evening of 25 August, British II Corps commander General Horace Smith-Dorrien, ordered his corps to stand and fight to deliver a stopping blow to the Germans. The Allies set up defensive positions near the town; as I Corps had not arrived, Smith-Dorrien's right flank was unprotected. On the morning of the 26 August, the Germans attacked with two infantry and three cavalry divisions against a British force comprising three infantry divisions, an infantry brigade and a cavalry division. Of the 40,000 Entente troops fighting at Le Cateau, 5,212 men were killed or wounded, c. 2,600 troops were captured and thirty-eight British guns were lost. The Germans suffered 2,900 casualties. As the British retreat continued south towards Paris, there were small, vigorous holding actions by various units of the British rearguard.

=== Rearguard Affair of Le Grand Fayt ===
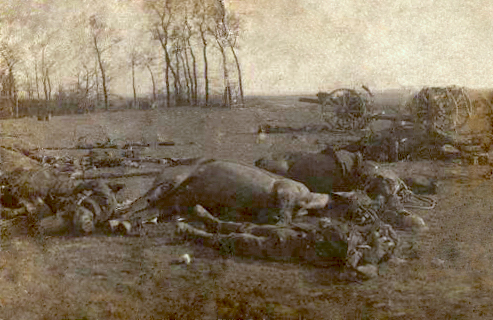
British dead shortly after the Battle of Le Cateau

The German 2nd Army commander General Karl von Bülow had ordered a rapid pursuit after the battles of 21–24 August against the French Fifth Army and the BEF. The 1st and 2nd armies were sent to the south-west to gain the left flank of the Allied line. The X Reserve Corps encountered "especially obstinate" resistance at Marbaix and Le Grand-Fayt. On the morning of 26 August 1914, the 2nd Connaught Rangers (2nd Division) under Lieutenant-Colonel A.W. Abercrombie were covering the retreat of the British 5th Infantry Brigade from Petit Landrecies. Unknown to Abercrombie, by late morning the retreat had already taken place but the orders had not been received by the Connaught Rangers.

Hearing the sound of rifle fire coming from near-by Marbaix, Abercrombie set off with two platoons of infantry towards the gunfire only to come under heavy artillery and machine-gun fire. Abercrombie then ordered his force to retire on Le Grand Fayt, which locals had told him was clear of Germans, only to discover that Le Grand Fayt had been abandoned. Abercrombie and his men then came under heavy fire from Germans concealed in the village and the order was given to retreat through the surrounding fields. Despite the heavy German fire and the difficulty of communication in the close terrain, the retreat was carried out in an orderly fashion, although six officers and 280 men were reported as still missing on 29 August, including Abercrombie. By the evening the X Reserve Corps was still near Marbaix and Avesnes. The pursuit by the 2nd Army was ordered to continue on 27 August through Landrecies and Trélon, with the X Reserve Corps advancing towards Wassigny.

=== Rearguard Affair of Étreux ===
Bülow had ordered the X Reserve Corps to continue its advance to the south-west, after the encounter at Le Grand-Fayt. The 2nd Royal Munster Fusiliers, had been ordered to hold its ground at all costs, in their first action in France. Less than a battalion strength, just three companies of the 2nd Battalion of the Munsters supported by a couple of field guns engaged the German attackers. The Munsters fell back to an orchard near Étreux and as night fell on the evening of 27 August, found themselves surrounded; having exhausted their ammunition, they surrendered. In the action at Ètreux, only four officers and 240 other ranks of the 2nd Munsters survived but the Battalion prevented German pursuit of the BEF I Corps, gaining valuable time for the BEF to escape. They were outnumbered at odds of over 6:1 and when finally defeated, the survivors were congratulated by the Germans. The X Reserve Corps had continued its advance towards Wassigny and Étreux on 27 August, where the 19th Reserve Division reported that it had "scattered a British battalion".

=== Affair of Cerizy ===
During the morning the 5th Cavalry Brigade moved to the west bank of the Oise about 2 mi (3.2 km) east of Cerizy (Moÿ-de-l'Aisne). Around noon German cavalry appeared on the road from St. Quentin and were engaged by a party of cavalry with a machine-gun 0.5 mi (0.80 km) east of Cerizy supported by a section of Royal Horse Artillery. The party of cavalry was forced back but German attempts to enter La Guinguette Farm were repulsed. In the afternoon, two German cavalry squadrons advanced; the Germans dismounted and then their horses bolted, followed by the riders. The British immediately pursued around the eastern flank and met mounted cavalry near Moy; the 12th Royal Lancers forced the Germans to dismount with rifle fire and stampeded their horses. A squadron of mounted lancers got within 50 yd (46 m), charged and inflicted 70–80 casualties with swords and lances for a loss of five killed. The British gathered c. 30 wounded and estimated that the total German loss was 300 casualties. The Germans had expected to meet a weak infantry detachment and attacked with three dismounted squadrons, intending to charge with three more. The Germans eventually managed to disengage and withdraw behind a hill north of the woods; during the evening the British retired to the south.

=== Affair of Néry ===
In a dense fog on 1 September, the British 1st Cavalry Brigade prepared to leave their bivouac and were surprised and attacked by the 4th Cavalry Division shortly after dawn. Both sides fought dismounted; the British artillery was mostly put out of action in the first few minutes but a gun of L Battery, Royal Horse Artillery kept up a steady fire for 2 1/2 hours, against a battery of twelve German field guns. British reinforcements arrived at around 8:00 a.m., when the German cavalry had nearly overrun some of the British artillery. Three British cavalry regiments assembled at the east end of Néry and stopped the German attack with machine-gun fire, after dismounted German cavalry had got within 500 yd (460 m) and at 6:00 a.m. two squadrons of the 5th Dragoon Guards charged the German right flank. The 4th Cavalry Brigade arrived with an infantry battalion and began to envelop the northern flank of the 4th Cavalry Division, which was caught out when a delivery of ammunition was delayed just as it ran short. The Germans tried to remove the twelve field guns but lost many men to machine-gun fire and left eight guns behind. The 11th Hussars pursued the Germans for 1 mi (1.6 km) and took 78 prisoners. At 9:00 a.m., General Otto von Garnier heard reports that Crépy and Béthisy were occupied and broke off the engagement, to rally east of Néry; the 4th Cavalry Division then moved south via Rocquemont to Rozières.

=== Rearguard Action of Crépy-en-Valois ===
Air reconnaissance on the fronts of the VII Corps and X Reserve Corps on 31 August reported that the British were retreating south of the Aisne towards Crépy-en-Valois. The five Jägerbattalions of the II Cavalry Corps were sent towards Crépy on 1 September and encountered the 13th Brigade of the 5th Division, which began to retire at 10:00 a.m. A German attack began from Béthancourt, about 4 mi (6.4 km) from Crépy and mainly met the West Kent on the left flank. The 119th Battery of the XXVII Brigade RFA was about 100 yd (91 m) from the British line and fired 150 shells in five minutes, when the Germans had approached within 1,400 yd (1,300 m). By noon the British had fallen back and German cavalry patrols probed forward without infantry. On the right flank, the 2nd Duke of Wellingtons at a crossroads near the Râperie, were able to withdraw, under cover of the other two batteries of the XXVII Brigade. The 1st Army had attempted to trap British rearguards at Crépy and Villers-Cotterêts (Villers) but they had slipped away. Air reconnaissance revealed that British columns were moving south from the area south-west of Villers, south of Crépy and from Creil.

=== Rearguard Actions of Villers-Cotterêts ===
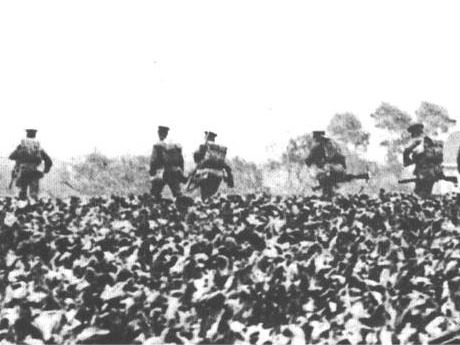
British troops retreating

On 31 August, German air reconnaissance saw British columns marching towards Villers and the 1st Army headquarters assumed that troops in the Oise valley were British and those retreating towards Soissons were French. Kluck concluded that it would be impossible to trap the British but a pursuit towards Soissons might catch up with the French. The II Cavalry Corps was ordered to advance southwards, as it was assumed that the British had reached Villers. During the afternoon another air reconnaissance reported that many troops were seen at the village and that some might be captured. Kluck ordered the 1st Army to advance southwards with unlimited objectives. The 6th Division of the III Corps, crossed the Aisne at Vic on 1 September and engaged the 3rd Cavalry Brigade at Taillefontaine, about 5 mi (8.0 km) north-west of Villers and drove it slowly back towards the village.

At 10:00 a.m. the 4th Guards Brigade was attacked by a mixed force of cavalry, infantry and artillery, which was repulsed until another attack at 10:45 a.m. and got round the western flank and advanced on an open area from Rond de la Reine to Croix de Belle Vue and filtered through gaps in the line of the 3rd Coldstream Guards, who fell back slowly, with the 2nd Grenadier Guards on the right. By 2:00 p.m. the British had retreated to the northern fringe of the village during hand-to-hand fighting. The British retreat began again at 6:00 p.m. and Villers was captured late in the night, after the British had retired to the south and south-west. By the end of the day the 1st Army headquarters had abandoned hope of cornering large British forces south of Verberie, Crépy-en-Valois and Villers.

=== Battle of St. Quentin ===
Joffre ordered a counter-attack by the Fifth Army on 29 August, at St. Quentin but a copy of the orders fell into German hands, which gave Bülow time to prepare. The attacks against the town by the XVIII Corps were a costly failure but the X and III corps on the right flank got forward and forced the Germans near Guise to fall back. The French attacked again during the morning of 30 August but the attacks were uncoordinated and repulsed; the Germans counter-attacked before noon. German infantry made slow progress through the Oise marshes amidst extensive artillery bombardments by both sides. By early afternoon, aircraft reconnaissance reports showed that the French had begun to withdraw and Bülow ordered a pursuit by small infantry parties with field artillery, while the main force paused to rest, due to exhaustion and to concern that the fortress of La Fère obstructed a general advance and should be masked, while the 1st Army enveloped the French from the west and then attacked on 1 September. The 2nd Army pursuit took only four guns, 16 machine-guns and c. 1,700 prisoners. On 31 August the Fifth Army continued the retreat to the Marne.

== Aftermath ==
=== Advance to the Aisne, 6 September – 1 October ===
==== Battle of the Marne ====
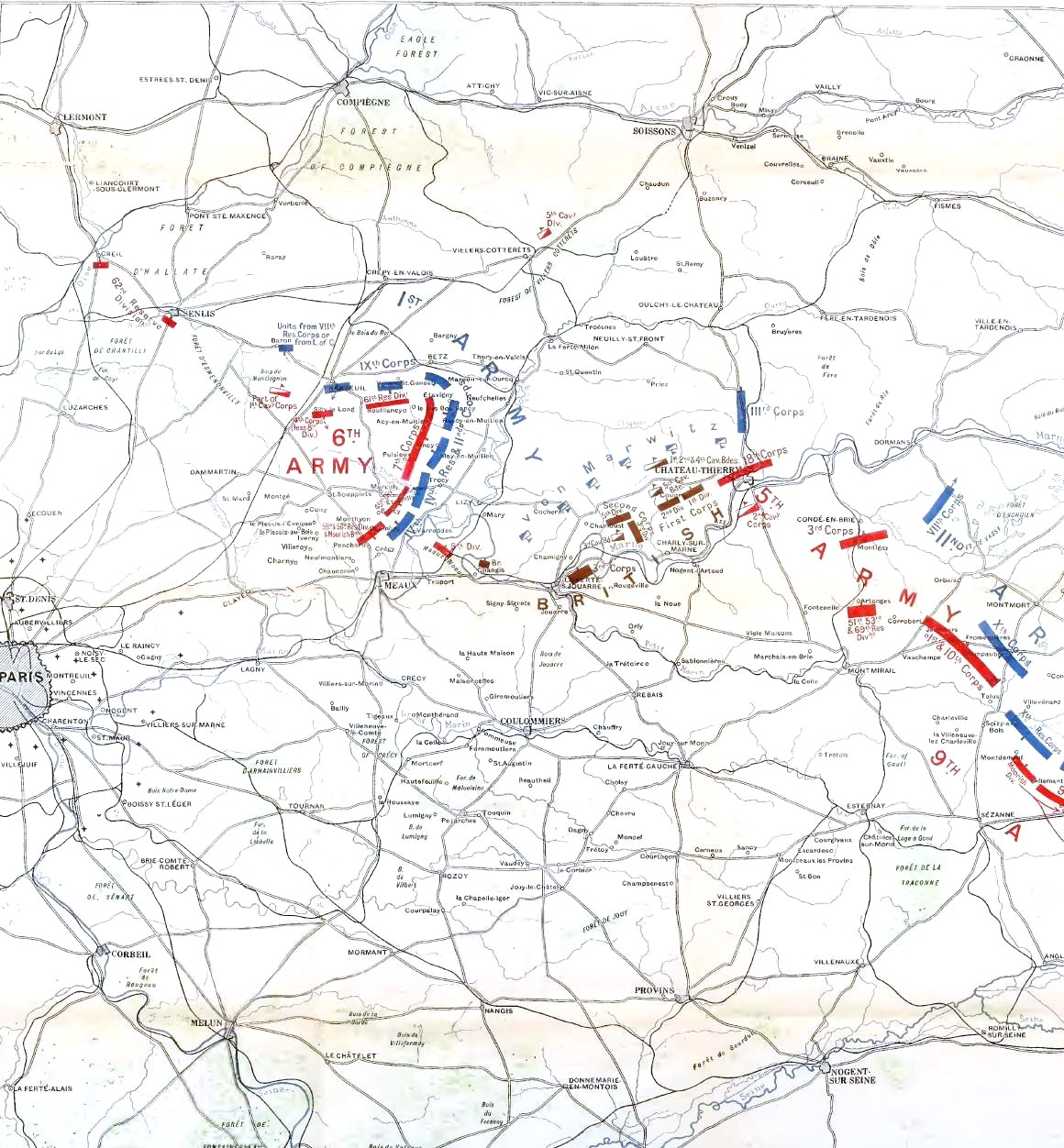
Battle of the Marne, west flank, 1914

Joffre used the railways which had transported French troops to the German frontier, to move troops back from Lorraine and Alsace, forming a new Sixth Army under General Michel-Joseph Maunoury, with nine divisions and two cavalry divisions. By 10 September, twenty divisions and three cavalry divisions had been moved west from the German border to the French centre and left and the balance of force between the German 1st–3rd armies and the Third, Fourth, Ninth, Fifth armies, the BEF and Sixth Army had changed to 44:56 divisions. Late on 4 September Joffre ordered the Sixth Army to attack eastwards over the Ourcq towards Château Thierry as the BEF advanced towards Montmirail and the Fifth Army attacked northwards, with its right flank protected by the Ninth Army along the St. Gond marshes. The French First–Fourth armies to the east were to resist the attacks of the German 5th–7th armies between Verdun and Toul and repulse an enveloping attack on the defences south of Nancy from the north. The 6th and 7th armies were reinforced by heavy artillery from Metz and attacked again on 4 September along the Moselle.

On 5 September the Sixth Army advanced eastwards from Paris against the German IV Reserve Corps, which had moved into the area that morning. The French were stopped short of high ground north of Meaux. Overnight the IV Reserve Corps withdrew to a better position 10 km (6.2 mi) east and French air reconnaissance observed German forces moving north to face the Sixth Army. General Alexander von Kluck the 1st Army commander, ordered the II Corps to move back to the north bank of the Marne, which began a redeployment of all four 1st Army corps to the north bank by 8 September. The swift move to the north bank prevented the Sixth Army from crossing the Ourcq but created a gap between the 1st and 2nd Armies. The BEF advanced from 6–8 September, crossed the Petit Morin and captured bridges over the Marne and established a bridgehead 8 km (5.0 mi) deep. The Fifth Army also advanced into the gap and by 8 September crossed the Petit Morin, which forced Bülow to withdraw the right flank of the 2nd Army. Next day the Fifth Army re-crossed the Marne and the German 1st and 2nd armies began to retire as the French Ninth, Fourth and Third armies fought defensive battles against the 3rd Army which was forced to retreat with the 1st and 2nd armies on 9 September.

BEF casualties, 1914
Month	
August	14,409
September	15,189
Total	29,598

Further east the Third Army was forced back to the west of Verdun as German attacks were made on the Meuse Heights to the south-east but managed to maintain contact with Verdun and the Fourth Army to the west. German attacks against the Second Army south of Verdun from 5 September almost forced the French to retreat but on 8 September the crisis eased. By 10 September the German armies west of Verdun were retreating towards the Aisne and the Franco-British were following-up, collecting stragglers and equipment. On 12 September, Joffre ordered an outflanking move to the west and an attack northwards by the Third Army to cut off the German retreat. The pursuit was too slow; on 14 September the German armies had dug in north of the Aisne and the Allies met trench lines rather than rearguards. Frontal attacks by the Ninth, Fifth and Sixth armies were repulsed on 15–16 September, which led Joffre to begin the transfer of the Second Army west to the left flank of the Sixth Army, the first phase of the operations to outflank the German armies, which from 17 September to 17–19 October moved the opposing armies through Picardy and Flanders to the North Sea coast.

==== First Battle of the Aisne ====
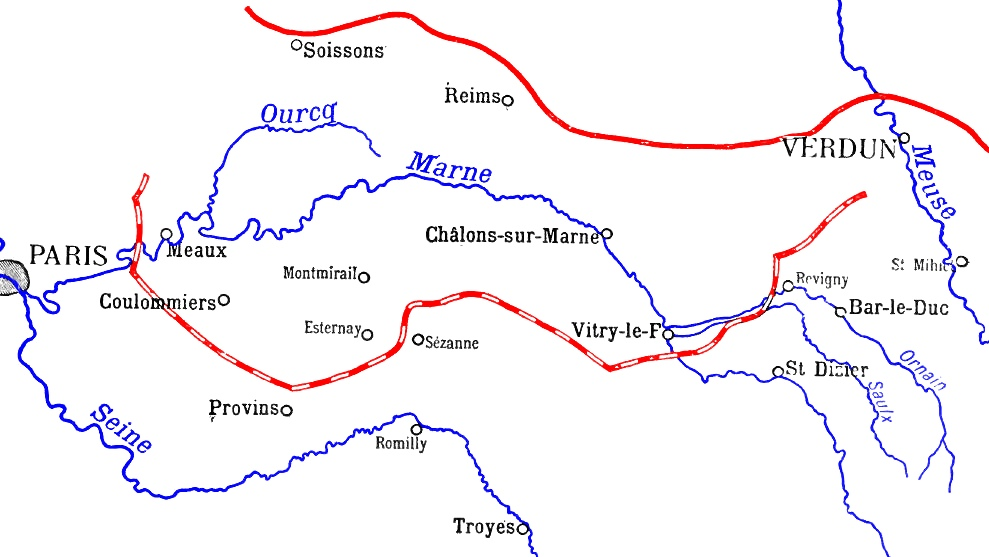
Opposing positions, 5 September: red dashed line; 13 September: red line

On 10 September Joffre ordered the French armies and the BEF to exploit the victory of the Marne and for four days the armies on the left flank advanced against German rearguards. On 11 and 12 September, Joffre ordered outflanking manoeuvres by the armies on the left flank but the advance was too slow to catch the Germans, who ended their withdrawal on 14 September. The Germans had reached high ground on the north bank of the Aisne and begun to dig in, which limited the French advance from 15–16 September to a few local gains. French troops had begun to move westwards on 2 September, using the undamaged railways behind the French front, which were able to move a corps to the left flank in 5–6 days. On 17 September, the French Sixth Army attacked from Soissons to Noyon, at the westernmost point of the French flank, with the XIII and IV corps, supported by the 61st and 62nd divisions of the 6th Group of Reserve Divisions, after which the fighting moved north to Lassigny and the French dug in around Nampcel.

The French Second Army completed a move from the east end of the French line and took over command of the left-hand corps of the Sixth Army, as indications appeared that German troops were also being moved from the eastern flank. The German IX Reserve Corps had arrived from Belgium and on 16 September joined the 1st Army for an attack to the south-west with the IV Corps and the 4th and 7th Cavalry divisions, against the attempted French envelopment. The attack was cancelled and the corps was ordered to withdraw behind the right flank of the 1st Army. The 2nd and 9th Cavalry divisions were dispatched as reinforcements next day but before the retirement began, the French attack reached Carlepont and Noyon, before being contained on 18 September. The German armies attacked from Verdun westwards to Rheims and the Aisne on 20 September, cut the main railway from Verdun to Paris and created the St Mihiel salient, south of the Verdun fortress zone. The main German effort remained on the western flank, which was revealed to the French by intercepted wireless messages. By 28 September, the Aisne front had stabilised; the BEF began to withdraw on the night of 1/2 October, the first troops arriving in the Abbeville area on 8/9 October. The BEF prepared to begin operations in Flanders and to join with British forces which had been in Belgium since August.

== See also ==
- La Ferté-sous-Jouarre memorial

== Bibliography ==
Books

- Bowman, T. (2003). Irish Regiments in the Great War: Regular Regiments at War. Manchester: Manchester University Press. ISBN 978-0-7190-6285-8.
- Doughty, R. A. (2005). Pyrrhic victory: French Strategy and Operations in the Great War. Cambridge, MA: Belknap Press. ISBN 978-0-674-01880-8.
- Edmonds, J. E. (1926). Military Operations France and Belgium, 1914: Mons, the Retreat to the Seine, the Marne and the Aisne August–October 1914. History of the Great War Based on Official Documents by Direction of the Historical Section of the Committee of Imperial Defence. Vol. I (2nd ed.). London: Macmillan. OCLC 58962523.
- Hamilton, E. (1916). The First Seven Divisions: Being a Detailed Account of the Fighting from Mons to Ypres. London: Hurst and Blackett. OCLC 3579926.
- Humphries, M. O.; Maker, J. (2013). Der Weltkrieg: 1914 The Battle of the Frontiers and Pursuit to the Marne. Germany's Western Front: Translations from the German Official History of the Great War. Vol. I. Part 1. Waterloo, Canada: Wilfrid Laurier University Press. ISBN 978-1-55458-373-7.
- Skinner, H. T.; Stacke, H. Fitz M. (1922). Principal Events 1914–1918. History of the Great War Based on Official Documents by Direction of the Historical Section of the Committee of Imperial Defence. London: HMSO. OCLC 17673086.
- Statistics of the Military Effort of the British Empire During the Great War, 1914–1920. London: HMSO. 1922. OCLC 610661991. Archived from the original on 2 August 2016.
- Strachan, H. (2001). The First World War: To Arms. Vol. I. Oxford: OUP. ISBN 978-0-19-926191-8.
- Terraine, J. (2002) [1960]. Mons: The Retreat to Victory (Wordsworth Military Library ed.). London: Batsford. OCLC 640881916.
- Tuchman, Barbara W. (1994). The Guns of August. New York: Ballantine Books. ISBN 034538623X. Originally published in 1962.
- Zuber, Terence (2011) [2010]. The Mons Myth. Stroud, Gloucestershire: The History Press. ISBN 978-0-7524-7628-5.

Websites

- "The Étreux Rearguard Action, 27 August 1914". Royal Muster Fusiliers Association Website. 2012.
- Sarsfield, W. S. (2013). "Connaught Rangers War Diary: Action at Le Grand Fayt (Connaught Rangers)". 1914–1918 net.
