= Saint-Germain-du-Plain =

- Commune
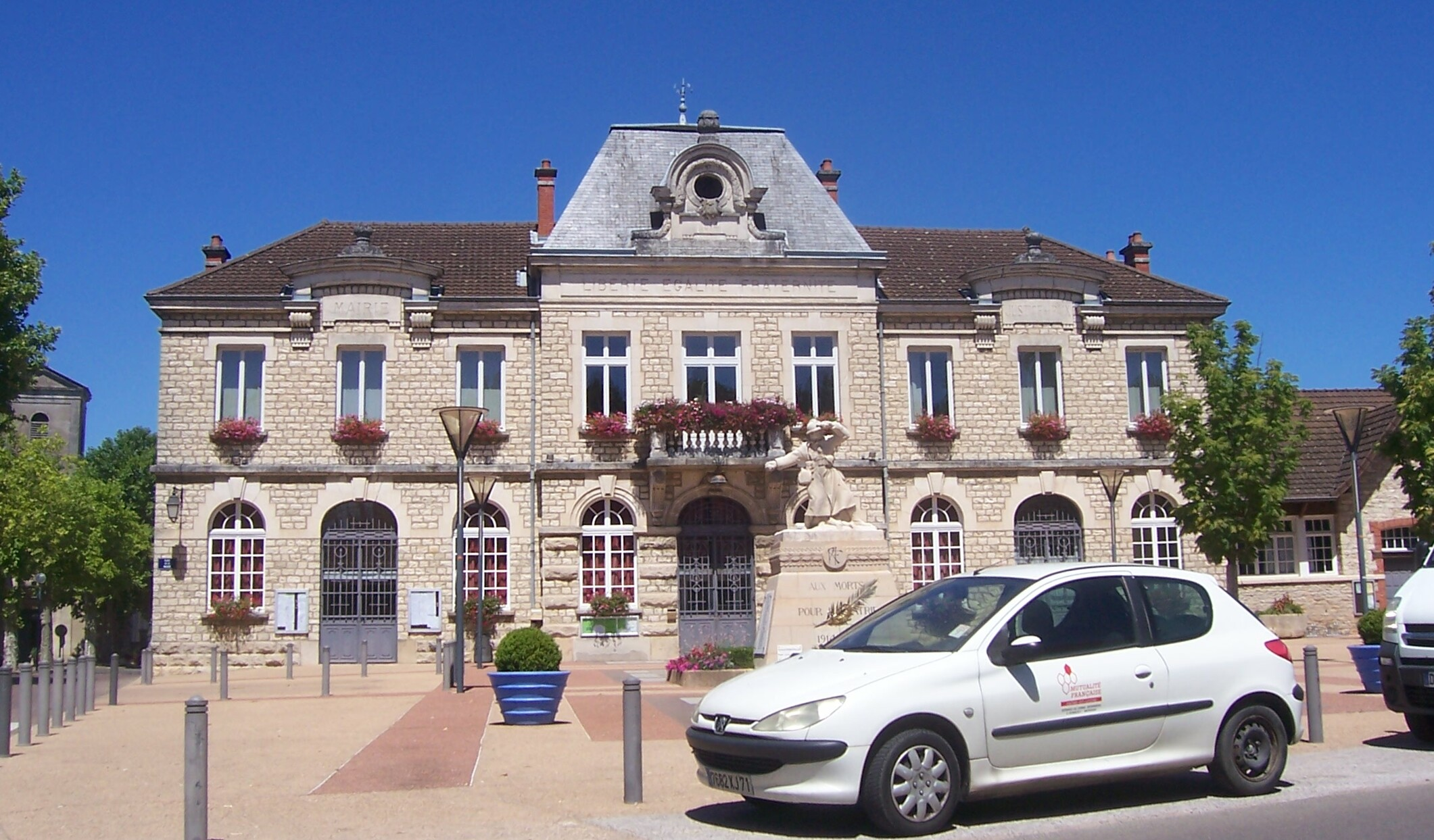
- The town hall in Saint-Germain-du-Plain
- Location of Saint-Germain-du-Plain
- Location within France Location within Bourgogne-Franche-Comté
- Coordinates: 46°42′04″N 4°59′06″E
- Country: France
- Region: Bourgogne-Franche-Comté
- Department: Saône-et-Loire
- Arrondissement: Louhans
- Canton: Ouroux-sur-Saône
- Area^{1}: 19.31 km^{2} (7.46 sq mi)
- Elevation: 184 m (604 ft)
- Highest elevation: 197 m (646 ft)
- Lowest elevation: 171 m (561 ft)
- Population (2023): 2,362
  - Density: 122.3/km^{2} (316.8/sq mi)
- Time zone: UTC+01:00 (CET)
  - Summer (DST): UTC+02:00 (CEST)
- INSEE/Postal code: 71420 /71370
- ^{1} French Land Register data, which excludes lakes, ponds, glaciers > 1 km^{2} (0.386 sq mi or 247 acres) and river estuaries.

Saint-Germain-du-Plain (French pronunciation: [sɛ̃ ʒɛʁmɛ̃ dy plɛ̃]) is a commune in the Saône-et-Loire department in the region of Bourgogne-Franche-Comté in eastern France.

== Population ==
Historical population
Year	Pop.	±% p.a.
1968	1,174	—
1975	1,368	+2.21%
1982	1,598	+2.24%
1990	1,698	+0.76%
1999	1,804	+0.68%
2007	2,069	+1.73%
2012	2,189	+1.13%
2017	2,290	+0.91%
2023	2,362	+0.52%
Source: INSEE

== See also ==
- Communes of the Saône-et-Loire department
