= 6th Army (France) =

Field army of the French Army during World War I and World War II

The Sixth Army (French: 6eme Armée) was a field army of the French Army during World War I and World War II.

== World War I ==
The Sixth Army was formed 26 August 1914, composed of troops from various disparate French armies: two active army corps, the (4th and 7th respectively detached from the Third Army and First Army, the 5th and 6th groups of reserve divisions (commanded by General de Lamaze), the 45th and 37th Infantry Divisions, a native brigade and a cavalry corps.

After Alexander von Kluck rotated his German First Army away from Paris to reinforce Karl von Bülow's German Second Army, Joseph Gallieni ordered the Sixth Army to attack von Kluck's forces. Although the German First Army counterattacked, this allowed John French's British Expeditionary Force to occupy a twenty-mile salient between the two armies beginning the First Battle of the Marne.

France would end up contributing three corps to the opening attack of the Battle of the Somme (the 20th Army Corps, I Colonial and 35th Corps of the Sixth Army).

== Commanders ==
=== World War I ===
- General Michel-Joseph Maunoury (26 August 1914 – 13 March 1915)
- General Pierre Joseph Dubois (13 March 1915 – 26 February 1916)
- General Émile Fayolle (26 February – 19 December 1916)
- General Charles Mangin (19 December 1916 – 4 May 1917)
- General Paul Maistre (4 May – 11 December 1917)
- General Denis Auguste Duchêne (11 December 1917 – 10 June 1918)
- General Jean Degoutte (10 June – 11 September 1918)
- General Antoine Baucheron de Boissoudy (15 October – 18 November 1918)
- General Jean Degoutte (18 November 1918)

=== World War II ===
- General Antoine-Marie-Benoît Besson (2 September 1939 - 16 October 1939)
- General René Olry (16 October 1939 – 13 February 1940)
- General Robert-Auguste Touchon (13 February – 1 July 1940)

== See also ==
- List of French armies in WWI
