= Alexander von Kluck =

German general (1846–1934)

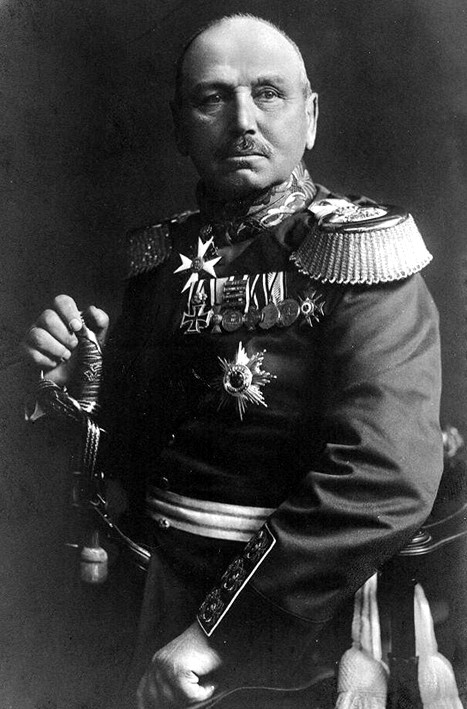
- Born: 20 May 1846; Münster, Kingdom of Prussia, German Confederation
- Died: 19 October 1934 (aged 88); Berlin, Nazi Germany
- Military career
- Allegiance: Prussia; German Empire
- Branch: Prussian Army
- Service years: 1866-1916
- Rank: Generaloberst
- Commands: 1st Army
- Conflicts: Austro-Prussian War; Franco-Prussian War; World War I
- Awards: Pour le Mérite
- Other work: Author

Alexander Heinrich Rudolph von Kluck (20 May 1846 – 19 October 1934) was a German general during World War I.

== Early life ==
Kluck was born in Münster, in Westphalia on 20 May 1846. He was the son of architect Karl Kluck and his wife Elisabeth, née Tiedemann. He was a pupil at a school called Paulinum in his hometown of Münster.

In 1874 he married Fanny von Donop (1850–1938); they had three sons and one daughter.

== Military career ==
He enlisted in the Prussian army in time to serve in the seven-week Austro-Prussian War of 1866 and the Franco-Prussian War, where he was wounded twice in the Battle of Colombey-Neuilly, and awarded the Iron Cross (second class) for bravery. He was made a general of infantry in 1906, and in 1913 was appointed Inspector General of the Seventh Army District.

=== World War I ===
With the outbreak of World War I, Kluck was placed in command of the German First Army. According to the Moltke revisions of the Schlieffen Plan, the First Army was part of the strong right wing and positioned on the outer western edge of the German advance through Belgium and France. This western flank was to advance alongside Karl von Bülow's Second Army to Paris. Upon reaching Paris in concert, the First and Second armies were to threaten Paris from both the west and east.

After fighting the British at Mons and Le Cateau, the First Army pursued Lanrezac's French Fifth Army during the great retreat. However, thirty miles from Paris and anticipating an encounter with the French Fifth Army (commanded by Lanrezac), the cautious Bülow halted his Second Army's advance and ordered Kluck's direct support. Kluck had recently been placed under Bülow's command when the latter was appointed to command the German right wing. Kluck protested this order to Bülow and Moltke, as he preferred to move past Lanrezac's left flank, but was overruled and ordered to support Bülow's attack on Lanrezac. By this time, the aggressive Kluck had advanced his First Army well south of von Bülow's position to 13 miles north of Paris. On August 30, Kluck decided to wheel his columns to the east of Paris, discarding entirely the Schlieffen Plan. Although frustrated by Bülow's caution, on 31 August Kluck turned his army southeast to support the Second Army. In so doing, Kluck created a 30-mile gap in the German line extending toward Bülow's stalled Second Army. Critically, the move exposed Kluck's right flank in the direction of Paris where (unknown to Kluck) General Michel-Joseph Maunoury's new Sixth Army was deployed. The French learned of Kluck's change in course on September 3 thanks to reports from Allied aircraft, and this was independently confirmed by radio intercepts. The following events were critical to the future course of the war.

Commander-in-Chief Joseph Joffre reportedly pleaded with the until-then cautious commander of the British Expeditionary Force Sir John French, who finally agreed to join the counterattack. On 5 September, Maunoury attacked Kluck's right (west) flank, marking the opening of the First Battle of the Marne. Kluck parried the blow by borrowing two corps in the space between the First and Second army. A surprise attack on 8 September by Franchet D'Esperey's (who had replaced Lanrezac) Fifth Army against Bülow's Second widened the gap which the British Expeditionary Force marched to exploit.

Kluck telegraphed von Moltke on the night of 8 September that the decisive victory would be won the following day. Instead, on 9 September a representative of the German Headquarters, Hentsch, considered the situation of Bülow's Army as very dangerous and ordered a retreat of all the armies, even though by that time Kluck had overcome most of his own problems. Ian Senior dismisses as a "myth" the claim in the German Official History that Kluck might have triumphed on 9 September. In fact the BEF was already over the Marne and Quast's attack against Maunoury's Sixth Army had failed, and suggests that this may be why Kluck avoided meeting Hentsch directly.

The Germans retreated in good order to positions forty miles behind the River Aisne. There, the front would remain for years in the form of entrenched positions as World War I continued.

Kluck and Bülow's lack of coordination and the ensuing failure to maintain an effective offensive line was a primary contribution to the failure of the Schlieffen Plan which was intended to deliver a decisive blow against France. Instead, the long stalemate of trench warfare was ready to begin. Many German experts hold Kluck and especially his chief of staff, Hermann von Kuhl, in the highest esteem. Germany could have won the Battle of the Marne, they think, if only Bülow had matched the courageous initiatives of Kluck's Army, although this doesn't explain the near encirclement of his army. The British at the time called him "old one o'clock".

“In great and dangerous operations one must not think but act”, was Kluck's favourite quote of Julius Caesar’s.

== Retirement and later life ==
Toward the end of March 1915, while inspecting an advanced portion of his troops, he was struck by shrapnel, which caused seven wounds and seriously injured his leg. Shortly afterward, he received the Order Pour le Mérite at the hospital. In October 1916 the Militär Wochenblatt reported that Kluck had been placed on half-pay, in accordance with his request to be allowed to retire. His son, Lieutenant Egon von Kluck, was killed early in 1915.

General von Kluck wrote of his participation in the War in the volume entitled Führung und Taten der Erste (1920). His post-war memoirs, The March on Paris and the Battle of the Marne, were published in 1920. Kluck died in Berlin in October 1934 and was buried at the Stahnsdorf South-Western Cemetery.

== In popular culture ==
Kluck was mentioned in a bawdy British army song (whose lyrics were written to the tune of the traditional folk-song The Girl I Left Behind Me), which in the original ran:

"Kaiser Bill is feeling ill,
The Crown Prince he's gone barmy.
We don't give a fuck for old von Kluck
And all his bleedin' army."

It was later reported styled in censored form, that is, in less offensive but wholly inaccurate language from a historical point of view. It is unclear if "crown prince" referred to Rupprecht, Crown Prince of Bavaria or Wilhelm, German Crown Prince, both army commanders for the duration of the war, though Wilhelm generally fought opposite the French.

Kluck is mentioned in Episode 2, “The Little Pink Book / Field Trip,” of Season 1 of the American animated comedy television series, Hey Arnold! Arnold's grandmother, upon seeing her distraught grandson, says, “I haven’t seen you this down since von Kluck swept through Belgium back in August ‘14.”

The 2016 video game Battlefield 1 has a weapon skin named after Kluck.

== Books ==
- Herwig, Holger (2009). The Marne. Random House. ISBN 978-0-8129-7829-2.
- Senior, Ian (2012). Home Before the Leaves Fall: A New History of the German Invasion of 1914. Osprey. ISBN 978-1-848-84209-0.
- Tuchman, Barbara (1962). The Guns of August. Macmillan.

Military offices
Preceded by Formed from VIII Army Inspectorate (VIII. Armee-Inspektion)	Commander, 1st Army; 2 August 1914 – 28 March 1915	Succeeded by General der Infanterie Max von Fabeck
