= Army Group North (France) =

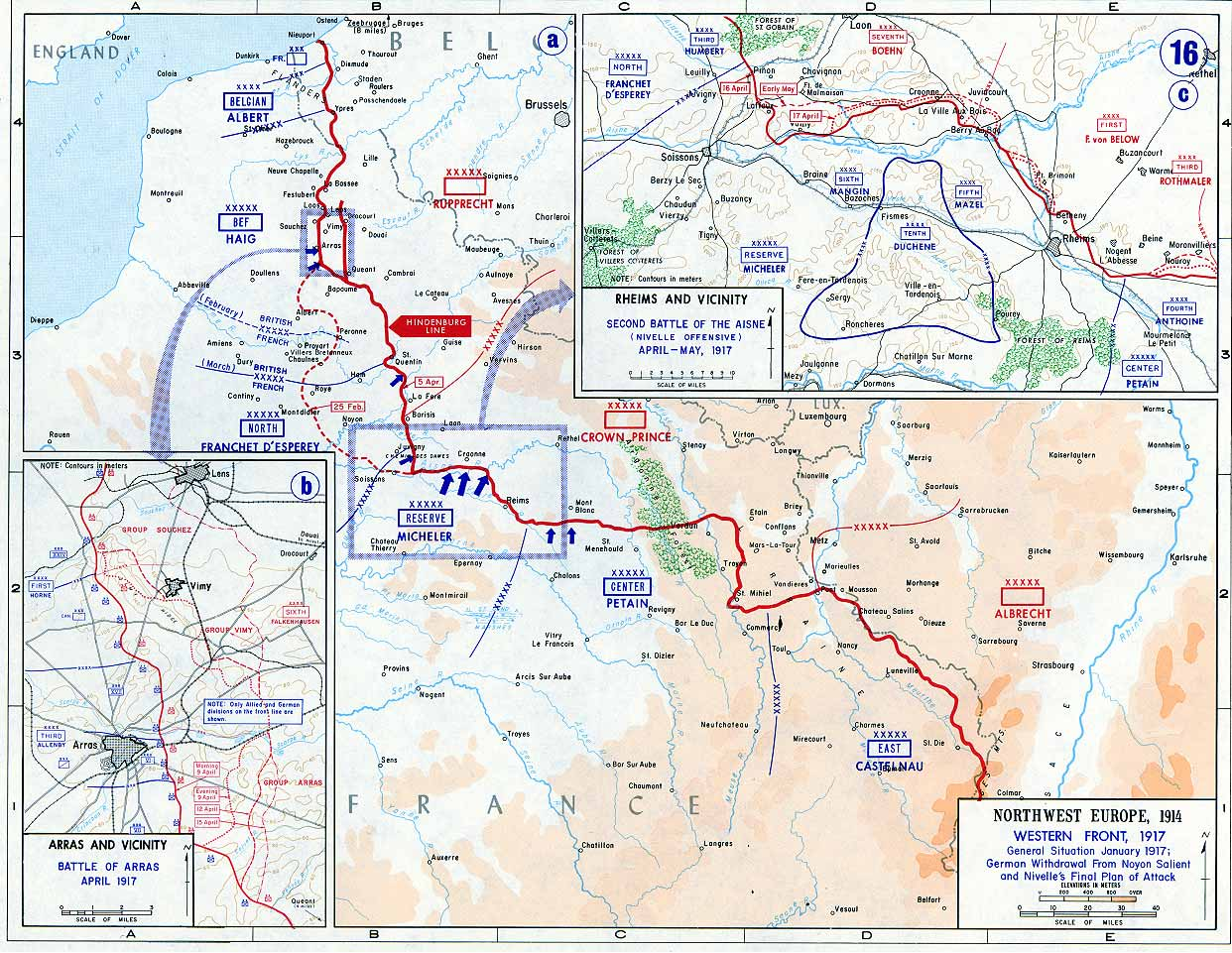
situation of the Army Group North in 1917

Army Group North (French: Groupe d'armées du Nord, GAN) was a grouping of French field armies during the First World War, which was created on 13 June 1915, from French: Groupe Provisoire du Nord (GPN) which had been formed on 4 October 1914. On 6 July 1918, GAN was renamed Groupe d'armées du Centre (GAC).

== Composition ==
=== October 1914 ===
- 2nd Army (général Philippe Pétain)
- 10th Army (général Louis de Maud'huy)
- Détachement d'Armée de Belgique (DAB) (général Victor d'Urbal)

=== 1 July 1915 ===
from North to South :

- Belgian Army (general Félix Wielemans)
- 36th French Army Corps (général de division Alexis Hély d'Oissel)
- 2nd British Army (General Horace Smith-Dorrien)
- 1st British Army (General Douglas Haig)
- 10th French Army (général Victor d'Urbal)
- 2nd French Army (général Philippe Pétain)

=== 1 July 1916 ===
from North to South :

- 6th Army (général Émile Fayolle)
- 10th Army (général Victor d'Urbal)

=== 15 February 1917 ===
from North to South :

- 3rd Army (général Georges Louis Humbert)
- 1st Army (général Émile Fayolle)

== Commanders ==
- Général Ferdinand Foch (4 October 1914 – 27 December 1916)
- Général Louis Franchet d'Espèrey (27 December 1916 – 10 June 1918)
- Général Paul Maistre (10 June – 6 July 1918)

== Sources ==
- The French Army and the First World War by Elizabeth Greenhalgh
- Cartographie 1914 - 1918
- Philippe Pétain et Marc Ferro (Avant-propos), La Guerre mondiale : 1914–1918, Toulouse, Éditions Privat, 2014, 372 p. (ISBN 978-2-708-96961-2, OCLC 891408727)
- Les Armées Françaises dans la Grande Guerre. Tome X. Premier volume, p. 13 et s. Ministère de la Guerre 1923–1924
