= Army Group East (France) =

WWI military formation

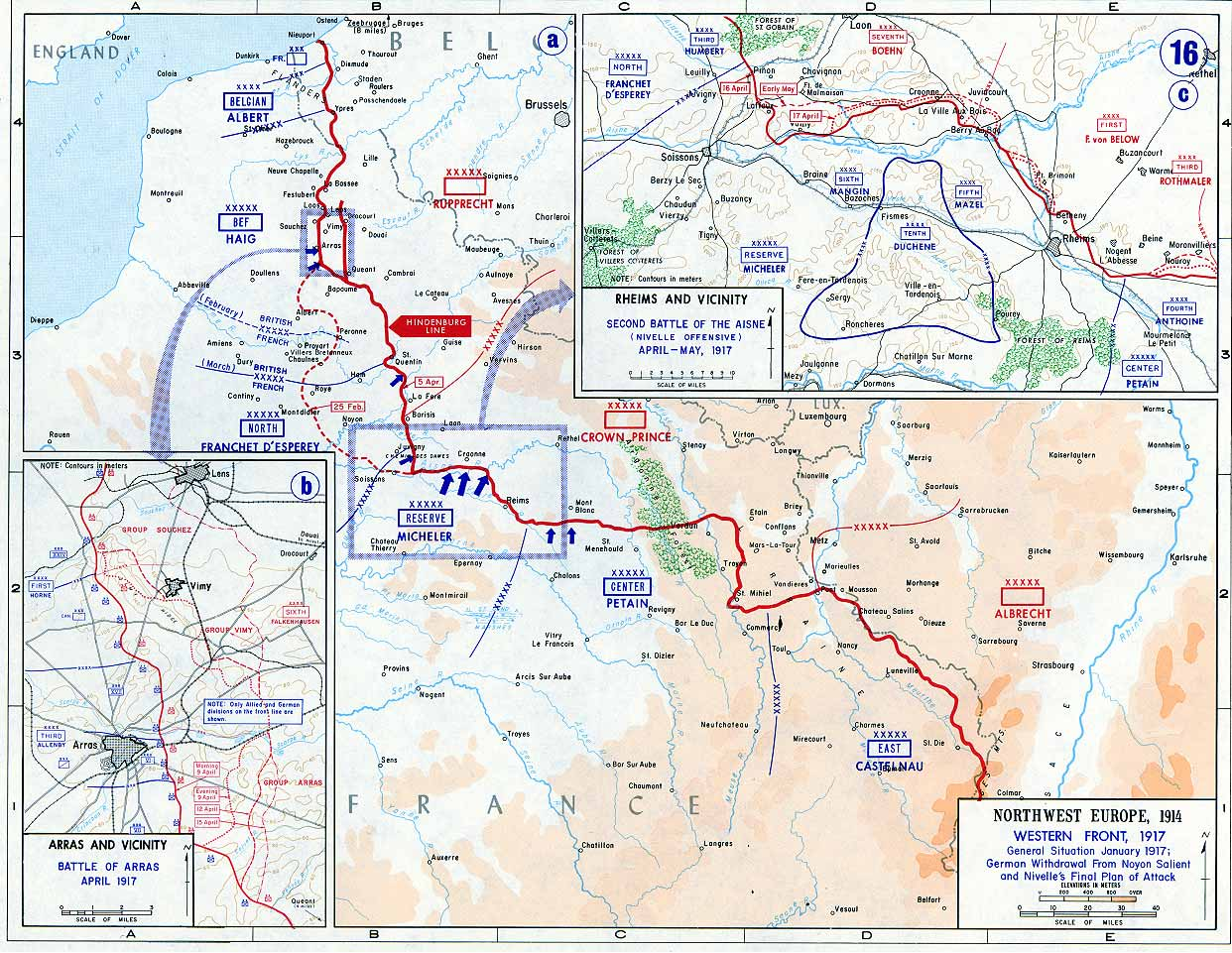
situation of the Army Group East in 1917

Army Group East (French: Groupe d'armées de l'Est, G. A. E.) was a grouping of French field armies during World War I, which was created on June 22, 1915 from the Groupe provisoire de l'Est (G. P. E.) which had been formed in January 1915. The army group covered the Western Front from the Swiss border to roughly east of Verdun.

== Composition ==
=== July 1, 1915 ===
from North to South :

- 3rd Army (général Maurice Sarrail)
- Détachement d'armée de Lorraine (DAL) (général George Humbert)
- 7th Army (général Louis de Maud'huy)

=== February 15, 1917 ===
From West to East :

- 8th Army (général Augustin Gérard)
- 7th Army (général Marie-Eugène Debeney)

=== May 25, 1918 ===
From West to East :

- 2nd Army (général Auguste Hirschauer)
- 8th Army (général Augustin Gérard)
- 7th Army (général Antoine de Boissoudy)

== Commanders ==
- Général Augustin Dubail (July 1, 1915 – March 31, 1916)
- Général Louis Franchet d'Espèrey (March 31, 1916 – December 27, 1916)
- Général Édouard de Castelnau (December 27, 1916 – December 1918)

== Sources ==
- The French Army and the First World War by Elizabeth Greenhalgh
- Philippe Pétain et Marc Ferro (Avant-propos), La Guerre mondiale : 1914–1918, Toulouse, Éditions Privat, 2014, 372 p. (ISBN 978-2-708-96961-2, OCLC 891408727)
- Victor Giraud, Histoire de la Grande Guerre, Paris, Librairie Hachette, 1920, 777 p.
