= 68th Infantry Division (France) =

The 68th Infantry Division (French: 68e Division d'Infanterie, 68e DI) was a French Army formation during the First and Second World Wars.

== First World War ==
During the war of 1914 to 1918, the division comprised:

- 206th Infantry Regiment
- 212th Infantry Regiment (to February 1917)
- 234th Infantry Regiment
- 257th Infantry Regiment (to June 1916)
- 323rd Infantry Regiment (to June 1916)
- 344th Infantry Regiment
- A battalion of the 73rd Territorial Infantry Regiment (from July 1917)

It was part of the French 2nd, 3rd, 7th, 11th, 13th, 14th, 15th, 16th, 17th, 20th, 21st, 35th, 39th and 40th Corps, during which it participated in the Battle of Morhange, the Battle of Grand Couronne, the Battle of Verdun, the Second Battle of the Marne, and the Meuse-Argonne Offensive.

At various times, the Division was part of the First, Second, Third, Fourth, Fifth, Sixth, Seventh, Eighth, and Tenth French Armies.

== Second World War ==
During the Battle of France in May 1940, the division contained the following units:

- 224th Infantry Regiment
- 225th Infantry Regiment
- 341st Infantry Regiment
- 59th Reconnaissance Battalion
- 89th Artillery Regiment
- 289th Artillery Regiment

It was a "Series B" Reserve division, containing older reservists. The division was used to defend the coast of northern France.
