= 32nd Infantry Division (France) =

French Army unit of World Wars I and II

The 32nd Infantry Division (French: 32e Division d'Infanterie, 32e DI) was a French Army formation during World War I and World War II.

== World War 1 ==
During World War I, the division comprised:

- 15th Infantry Regiment
- 53rd Infantry Regiment (to June 1915)
- 80th Infantry Regiment
- 143rd Infantry Regiment
- 342nd Infantry Regiment (from June 1915 to May 1917)
- 35th Territorial Infantry Regiment (from August 1918)

It was part of the French 16th Corps, during which it participated in the Battle of Morhange, Battle of Grand Couronné, Battle of Flirey, the First Battle of Ypres, the First Battle of Champagne, the Second Battle of Champagne, the Battle of the Lys and the pursuit to and past the Hindenburg line.

At various times, it was part of the French First Army, French Second Army, French Third Army, French Fifth Army, French Sixth Army, French Seventh Army, French Eighth Army and French Tenth Army.

== World War 2 ==
During the Battle of France in May 1940 the division contained the following units:

- 87th Infantry Regiment
- 122nd Infantry Regiment
- 143rd Infantry Regiment
- 38th Reconnaissance Group
- 3rd Artillery Regiment
- 203rd Artillery Regiment

It was an active division which existed during peacetime. During the evacuation of the British Expeditionary Force at Dunkirk, the division held the line towards the end of the battle before being evacuated across the English Channel.

In mid-June 1940, the division was recreated as 32nd Light Infantry Division in Normandy.
