= Winter operations 1914–1915 =

Military operations during the First World War

- Part of the Western Front of the First World War
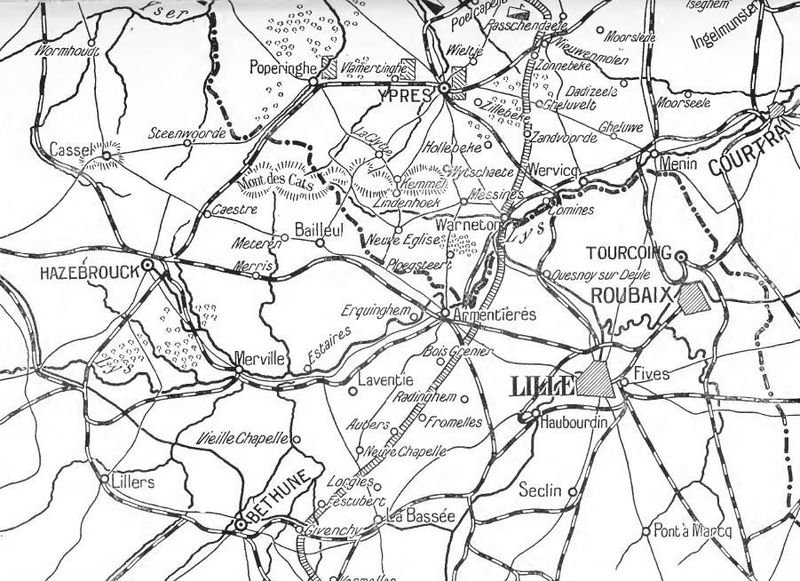
- Western Flanders, Winter 1914–1915
Date	23 November 1914 – 6 February 1915
Location	Belgian and French Flanders 50°41′17″N 02°52′52″E
Result	Inconclusive

Belligerents
British Empire: United Kingdom; Canada; India	German Empire

Commanders and leaders
Douglas Haig	Crown Prince Rupprecht

Winter operations 1914–1915 is the name given to military operations during the First World War, from 23 November 1914 – 6 February 1915, in the 1921 report of the British government Battles Nomenclature Committee. The operations took place on the part of the Western Front held by the British Expeditionary Force (BEF), in French and Belgian Flanders.

After the northern flank of the Western Front had disappeared during the Race to the Sea in late 1914, the Franco-British attacked towards Lille in October, then the BEF, Belgians and the French Eighth Army attacked in Belgium. A German offensive began on 21 October but the 4th Army (Generaloberst Albrecht, Duke of Württemberg) and 6th Army (Generaloberst Rupprecht, Crown Prince of Bavaria) were only able to take small amounts of ground, at great cost to both sides, at the Battle of the Yser (16–31 October) and further south in the First Battle of Ypres (19 October – 22 November).

By 8 November, the Germans realised that the advance along the coast had failed and that taking Ypres was impossible. Attacks by both sides had quickly been defeated and the opposing armies had improvised field defences, against which attacks were costly failures. By the end of the First Battle of Ypres in November 1914, both sides were exhausted, short of ammunition and suffering from collapses in morale, some infantry units refusing orders. The costly and inconclusive result of the First Battle of Flanders was followed by trench warfare, in which both sides tried to improve their positions as far as the winter weather, mutual exhaustion and chronic equipment and ammunition shortages allowed.

== Background ==
=== Race to the Sea ===
From 17 September to 17 October 1914, the belligerents had made reciprocal attempts to turn the northern flank of their opponent. Joffre ordered the French Second Army to move to the north of the French Sixth Army, by moving from eastern France from 2 to 9 September and Falkenhayn ordered the German 6th Army to move from the German-French border to the northern flank on 17 September. By the next day, French attacks north of the Aisne led to Falkenhayn ordering the 6th Army to repulse French forces and secure the flank. When the French Second Army advanced, it met a German attack rather than an open flank on 24 September; by 29 September, the Second Army comprised eight corps but was still opposed by German forces near Lille, rather than advancing around the German northern flank. The German 6th Army had also found that on arrival in the north, that it was forced to oppose the French attack, rather than advance around the flank; the secondary objective of protecting the northern flank of the German armies in France had become the main task. By 6 October, the French needed British reinforcements to withstand German attacks around Lille. The BEF had begun to move from the Aisne to Flanders on 5 October and with reinforcements from England, assembled on the left flank of the Tenth Army, which had been formed from the left flank units of the Second Army on 4 October.

=== Tactical developments ===
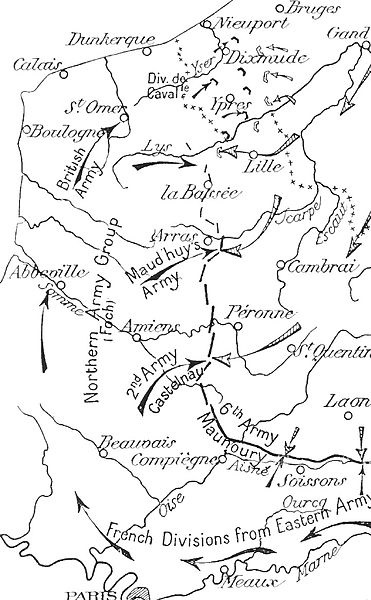
German and Allied operations, Artois and Flanders, September–November 1914

In October 1914 French and British artillery commanders met to discuss means for supporting infantry attacks, the British practice having been to keep the artillery silent until targets were identified. The French artillery fired a burst of fire (rafale), which ceased as the infantry began the assault. A moving barrage of fire was proposed as a combination of both methods and became a standard practice once when guns and ammunition were accumulated in sufficient quantity. Falkenhayn issued memoranda on 7 and 25 January 1915, defining a model of defensive warfare to be used on the Western Front, to enable ground to be held with the fewest possible troops. By reducing demand for manpower in the west, a larger number of divisions could be sent to the Eastern Front.

The front line was to be fortified, to enable its defence with small numbers of troops indefinitely; areas captured were to be recovered by counter-attacks. A second trench was to be dug behind the front line, to shelter the trench garrison and to have easy access to the front line, through covered communication trenches. Should counter-attacks fail to recover the front trench, a rearward line was to be connected to the remaining parts of the front line, limiting the loss of ground to a bend (Ausbeulung) in the line, rather than a breakthrough. The building of the new defences took until the autumn of 1915 and confronted Franco-British offensives with an evolving system of field fortifications, which was able to absorb the increasing power and sophistication of attacks.

During the mobile operations of 1914, armies which operated in enemy territory were forced to rely on wireless communication to a far greater extent than anticipated, having expected to use telegraph, telephones and dispatch riders. None of the armies had established cryptographic systems adequate to protect wireless transmissions from eavesdropping and all of the attacking armies sent messages containing vital information in plain language. From September to November 1914, the British and French intercepted c. 50 German messages, which showed the disorganisation of the German command in mid-September and the gap between the 1st Army and 2nd Army on the eve of the Battle of the Marne. Plain language messages and decodes of crude attempts to disguise German messages gave warnings to the British of the times, places and strengths of eight attacks, of four corps or more, during the Race to the Sea and the subsequent battles in Flanders.

== Prelude ==
=== First Battle of Flanders ===
BEF casualties August–December 1914
Month	Losses
August	14,409
September	15,189
October	30,192
November	24,785
December	11,079
Total	95,654

Both sides tried to advance, after the "open" northern flank had disappeared, Franco-British attacks towards Lille in October were succeeded by attacks of the BEF, Belgians and a new French Eighth Army (Général Victor d'Urbal). A German offensive began on 21 October but the 4th Army and 6th Army were only able to take small amounts of ground, at great cost to both sides, at the Battle of the Yser (16–31 October) and further south at Ypres. Falkenhayn then attempted to achieve the limited goal of capturing Ypres and Mount Kemmel, from 19 October to 22 November). By 8 November, Falkenhayn accepted that the advance along the coast had failed and that taking Ypres was impossible. The French and Germans had failed to assemble forces near the northern flank swiftly enough to obtain a decisive advantage. Attacks had quickly been stopped and the armies had then improvised field defences, against which attacks were repulsed with many more casualties. By the end of the First Battle of Ypres, both sides were exhausted, short of ammunition and suffering from collapses in morale; some infantry units refused orders.

The mutual failure in Flanders led both sides to elaborate the improvised field fortifications of 1914, which made a return to mobile warfare even less likely. In November, Falkenhayn reconsidered German strategy, because the failures on the Yser and at Ypres showed that Germany lacked the forces in the west to obtain a decisive victory; a strategy of annihilation (Vernichtungsstrategie) and a dictated peace were beyond German resources. Falkenhayn doubted that victory was possible on the eastern front either, although advocated by Paul von Hindenburg and Erich Ludendorff, because the Russian armies could retreat at will into the vastness of Russia, as they had done during the French invasion of Russia in 1812. On 18 November, Falkenhayn took the unprecedented step of asking the Chancellor, Theobald von Bethmann Hollweg, to negotiate a separate peace with Russia. Falkenhayn intended to detach Russia or France from the Entente by diplomatic as well as military action. A strategy of attrition (Ermattungsstrategie) would make the cost of the war too great for the Allies to bear, until one Entente power negotiated an end to the war on mutually acceptable terms. The remaining belligerents would have to negotiate or face the German army concentrated on the remaining front, which would be sufficient to obtain a decisive victory.

== Winter operations ==
=== Defence of Festubert ===
A reorganisation of the defence of Flanders was carried out by the Franco–British from 15 to 22 November, which left the BEF holding a homogeneous front from Givenchy to Wytschaete, 21 mi (34 km) to the north. The Indian Corps, on the right flank, held a 2 mi (3.2 km) front. During three weeks of bad weather, both sides shelled, sniped and raided, the British making several night raids late in November. On 23 November, the German Infantry Regiment 112 captured 800 yd (730 m) of trench east of Festubert, which were then recaptured by a night counter-attack by the Meerut Division, at a cost of 919 Indian Corps casualties.

=== Attack on Wytschaete ===
Joffre arranged for a series of attacks on the Western Front after discovering that German divisions were moving to the Russian Front. The Eighth Army was ordered to attack in Flanders and Field Marshal Sir John French was asked to participate with the BEF on 14 December. Joffre wanted the British to attack all along the BEF front, especially from Warneton to Messines, as the French attacked from Wytschaete north to Hollebeke. French gave orders to attack from the Lys to Warneton and Hollebeke with II Corps and III Corps, as IV Corps and the Indian Corps conducted local operations to fix the Germans to their front. French emphasised that the British attack would begin on the left flank next to the French and that units must not move ahead of each other. The French and the 3rd Division were to capture Wytschaete and Petit Bois, then Spanbroekmolen was to be taken by II Corps with an attack from the west and by III Corps attacking from the south, only the 3rd Division to make a maximum effort. On the right, the 5th Division was to simulate an attack and III Corps was to make demonstrations, as it was holding a 10 mi (16 km) front and could do no more.

On the left, the French XVI Corps failed to reach its objectives and the 3rd Division got to within 50 yd (46 m) of the German line and found uncut wire. One battalion captured 200 yd (180 m) of the German front trench and took 42 prisoners. The failure of the attack on Wytschaete led to the attack further south being cancelled but German artillery retaliation was much heavier than the British bombardment. Desultory attacks were made from 15 to 16 December against intact German defences and deep mud, making no impression. On 17 December, the French XVI Corps and the British II Corps did not attack, the French IX Corps sapped forward a short distance down the Menin road and small gains were made at Klein Zillebeke and Bixschoote. Joffre ended attacks in the north, except at Arras and again requested support from French, who ordered attacks on 18 December along the British front, then restricted the attacks to the support of XVI Corps by II Corps and demonstrations by II Corps and the Indian Corps. Fog impeded the Arras attack and a German counter-attack against XVI Corps, led II Corps to cancel its supporting attack. Six small attacks were made by the Eighth Division, 7th Division, 4th Division and Indian divisions, which captured little ground, all of which was untenable due to mud and waterlogged ground after which, Franco-British attacks in Flanders were stopped.

=== Defence of Givenchy ===
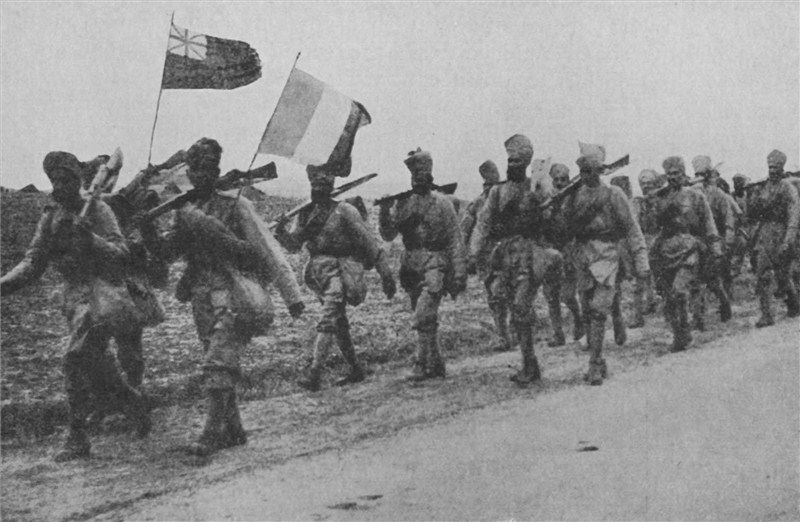
Indian reinforcements who fought at Givenchy, December 1914

At dawn on 20 December, the front of the Indian Corps, held by the Lahore and Meerut divisions was bombarded by German heavy artillery and mortars. At 9:00 a.m., ten mines, of 110 lb (50 kg) each, were exploded under the British lines at Givenchy-lès-la-Bassée (Givenchy) and followed up by infantry attacks from the village northwards to La Quinque Rue. The trenches either side of Givenchy were captured and east of Festubert German troops advanced for 300 yd (270 m). During the afternoon, a brigade of the 1st Division (I Corps was sent forward as reinforcement, followed by another brigade at 3:17 p.m. Next day, both brigades rested until noon and then attacked towards Givenchy and the break-in near Festubert.

The third 1st Division brigade arrived during the afternoon and was sent forward to recapture The Orchard, 1 mi (1.6 km) north-east of Festubert, which had been captured during the morning. Waterlogged ground and German machine-gun fire delayed the advance, which only reached Givenchy after dark, just after the garrison had retired. The 1st Guards Brigade and French Territorial troops retook the village but the disruption of the counter-attack left a small amount of ground near Festubert on the northern flank in German hands. The 1st Division brigades were isolated in the dark and the Indian Corps commander reported that the troops were exhausted and must be relieved. It was arranged through General Headquarters, that I Corps would relieve the Indian Corps on 21 December, which was completed on 22 December.

=== First Action of Givenchy ===
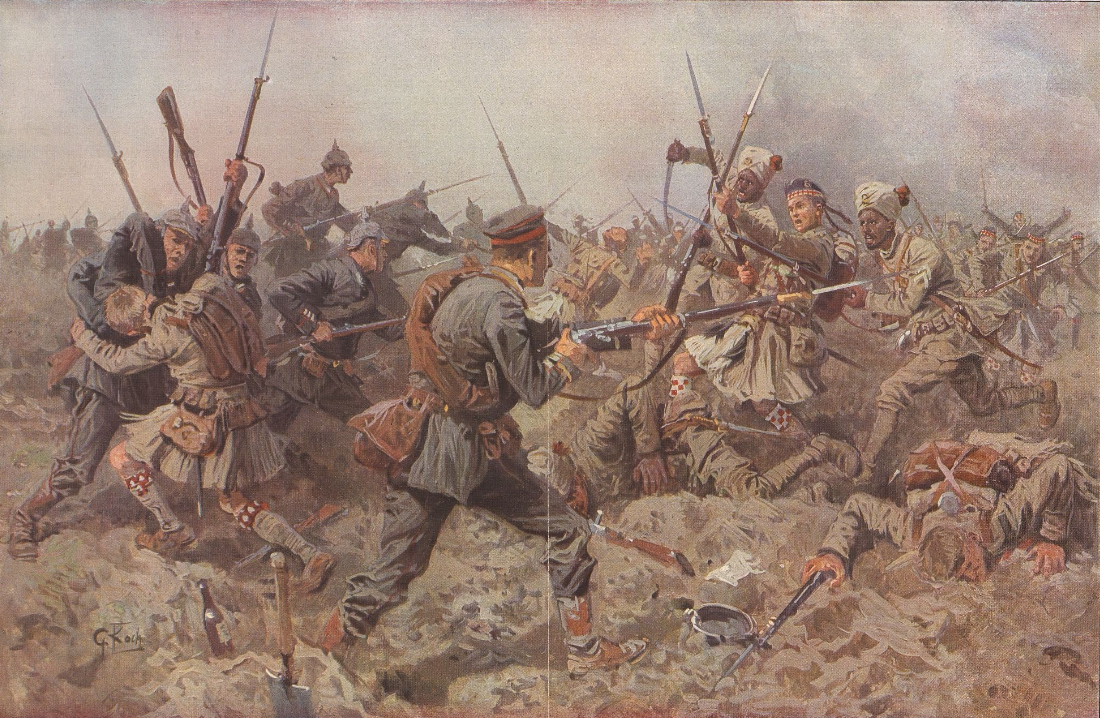
German (Baden) and British (Scottish and Indian) troops fighting near Givenchy, January 1915 (G. C. Koch)

A German soldier deserted on 25 January and disclosed that a German attack was due against Cuinchy, French positions to the south and against Givenchy to the north. About ninety minutes later, units of the German Infantry Brigade 79 of the 14th Division, attacked on the north bank of the canal. Near Givenchy, German infantry reached strong points behind the support line but could advance no further. A hasty counter-attack by the 3rd Brigade of the 1st Division, which had two companies per battalion in the line, one in local reserve and one in brigade reserve, drove the Germans back and re-captured the British trenches, taking 72 prisoners and killing 135 German soldiers.

=== Affairs of Cuinchy ===
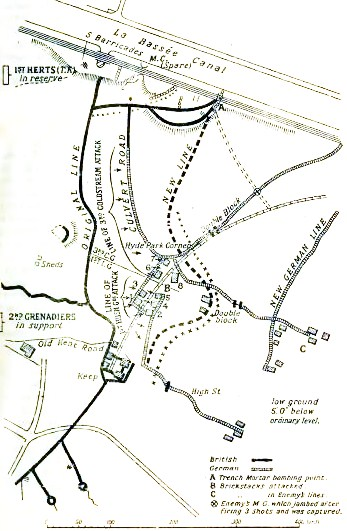
Affairs of Cuinchy, 29 January, 1 and 6 February 1915

In January 1915, rain, snow and floods added to the dangers of sniping and artillery-fire during the day; at night both sides concentrated on repairing trenches. The area from the old La Bassée battlefield to Kemmel, 20 mi (32 km) to the north, was mainly flat low-lying meadow, in the basin of the Lys (Leie) river. Clay sub-soil stopped water soaking more than 2 ft (0.61 m) down, which left trenches waterlogged. The Lys rose 7 ft (2.1 m), spread out by more than 100 ft (30 m) and some trenches had to be abandoned. In other places trenches were blocked at both ends and continuously bailed out, the intervening ground being covered by crossfire from the "islands". Many men stood knee-deep in water and were relieved twice a day. In January sickness in the First Army averaged 2,144 men per day.

On 1 January, a German attack captured several British posts on a railway embankment at brick stacks near La Bassée Canal, in the vicinity of Cuinchy, held by the 2nd Brigade of the 1st Division. A battalion counter-attack at 10:00 p.m. failed and a second attempt at 4:00 a.m. on 2 January was eventually repulsed. A bigger British attack on 10 January recaptured the posts and defeated three German counter-attacks but then lost the posts to a German attack on 12 January. A German deserter disclosed that a larger German attack was due against Cuinchy, French positions to the south and against Givenchy to the north. About ninety minutes later, units of the German 84th Brigade (29th Division) and 79th Brigade attacked on either side of the canal. The German infantry reached the Allied strong-points behind the support line but could not advance further.

After a delay, a counter-attack began on the south bank and was repulsed, which left the British line south of the canal in a re-entrant. On 29 January, there were two more German attacks which were repulsed by two 2nd Brigade battalions. Another attack on 1 February took a post on the railway embankment, which was recovered by a counter-attack and 32 German troops were taken prisoner. The 2nd Division relieved the 1st Division on 4 February; on 6 February, the 4th (Guards) Brigade crossed no man's land in the dark and then attacked to push forward the line on the flanks. The attack captured the brick stacks and improved the line at the junction with the French. (Note: Experiments with aerial photography from aeroplanes, to map the German front line, had been conducted by the British during the winter. The Cuinchy area was photographed by 3 Squadron Royal Flying Corps (RFC), which revealed a new German trench, causing the plan being amended and the junction of the Anglo-French boundary being defined with precision.) German counter-attacks including a deception failed when a group of Germans approached the British line, calling out "Don't shoot, we are engineers!". James Edmonds, the British official historian, called this a legitimate ruse, since an alert defender could be expected to challenge the party and allow only one man to approach.

== Aftermath ==
=== Analysis ===
After the war, the Reichsarchiv historians wrote that the Franco-British armies conducted attacks from 17 December between Arras and Armentières. By 20 December, the Allied attacks had been contained but skirmishing continued around Carency, Ecurie, Neuve Chapelle and La Bassée. On 1 January 1915, the 6th Army, near Arras, was ordered to capture the chapel on the Lorette Spur with the XIV Corps, after which VII Corps would join the attack on either side of La Bassée Canal, from Givenchy to Cuinchy but lack of resources led to a costly stalemate by February 1915.

=== Subsequent operations ===
At 7:30 a.m. on 10 March, the British began a thirty-five minute artillery bombardment by 90 18-pounder field guns, of the Indian Corps and IV Corps, on the German wire around the village of Neuve Chapelle, which was destroyed within ten minutes. The remaining fifteen 18-pounder batteries, six 6-inch howitzer siege batteries and six QF 4.5-inch howitzer batteries, fired on the German front-line trenches which were 3 ft (0.91 m) deep with breastworks 4 ft (1.2 m) high. The German fortifications were demolished by the howitzer bombardment, which was followed by an infantry assault at 8:05 a.m. German defences in the centre were quickly overrun on a 1,600 yd (1,500 m) front and Neuve Chapelle village was captured by 10:00 a.m.

On the left of the attack, two companies of the German Jäger Battalion 11 with c. 200 men and a machine-gun, delayed the advance for more than six hours until forced to retreat but this had stopped the advance. Although aerial photography had been useful, it was unable efficiently to identify the strong German defensive points. Lack of communication also meant that the British commanders had been unable to keep in touch with each other and the attack became disorganised, which disrupted the delivery of supplies. On 12 March, German forces commanded by Crown Prince Rupprecht, launched an abortive counter-attack which forced the British to use most of their artillery ammunition; the British offensive was postponed on 13 March and abandoned two days later.
