= 55th Infantry Division (France) =

- Unit insignia
- Active: 1914 - 1940
- Country: France
- Branch: French Army
- Type: Infantry
- Engagements: World War I: First Battle of the Marne; First Battle of the Aisne; Second Battle of Artois; Third Battle of Artois; Battle of Verdun; First Battle of Noyon; Third Battle of the Aisne; Second Battle of Noyon; World War II: Battle of France

The 55th Infantry Division (French: 55e Division d'Infanterie, 55e DI) was a French Army formation during World War I and World War II.

== World War I ==
During World War I, the division comprised:

- 204th Infantry Regiment (to September 1918)
- 231st Infantry Regiment (to May 1916)
- 246th Infantry Regiment (to September 1918)
- 276th Infantry Regiment (to March 1916)
- 282nd Infantry Regiment (to May 1916)
- 289th Infantry Regiment (to September 1918)
- 67th Territorial Infantry Regiment (to September 1918)

It was part of the French 1st, 2nd, 4th, 5th, 7th, 11th, 15th, 16th, 17th, 18th, 30th, 31st, 33rd, 35th, 37th, 1st Colonial, 1st Cavalry Corps during which it participated in the First Battle of the Marne, the First Battle of the Aisne, the Second and Third Battle of Artois, the Battle of Verdun, the First Battle of Noyon, the Third Battle of the Aisne and the Second Battle of Noyon. The Division was dissolved on 10 September 1918.

At various times, it was part of the French Second Army, French Third Army, French Fourth Army, French Fifth Army, French Sixth Army and French Tenth Army.

== World War II ==
Insignia of the 55th Infantry Division (1940)

During the Battle of France in May 1940 the division contained the following units:

- 213th Infantry Regiment,
- 295th Infantry Regiment,
- 331at Infantry Regiment,
- 11th Machine Gun Battalion,
- 64th Reconnaissance Battalion,
- 45th Artillery Regiment

It was a Series B Reserve division containing older reservists.
