= 41st Infantry Division (France) =

The 41st Infantry Division (French: 41e Division d'Infanterie, 41e DI) was a French Army formation during World War I and World War II.

== World War 1 ==
During World War I, the division comprised:

- 23rd Infantry Regiment
- 42nd Infantry Regiment (from June 1917)
- 128th Infantry Regiment (from November 1917)
- 133rd Infantry Regiment (to June 1917)
- 152nd Infantry Regiment (to December 1914)
- 215th Infantry Regiment (from December 1914 to June 1916)
- 229th Infantry Regiment (from March 1916 to November 1917)
- 253rd Infantry Regiment (from December 1914 to June 1916)
- 343rd Infantry Regiment (from December 1914 to June 1916)
- 363rd Infantry Regiment (from September 1914 to September 1917)
- 373rd Infantry Regiment (from September 1914 to June 1916)
- 37th Territorial Infantry Regiment (from September 1914 to June 1915)
- 54th Territorial Infantry Regiment (from August 1918)

It was part of the French 1st, 3rd, 7th, 9th, 11th, 12th, 15th, 16th, 18th, 20th, 30th, 34th and 38th Corps, during which it participated in the Battle of the Frontiers, the Battle of the Somme, the Second Battle of the Aisne, the Battle of the Lys, the Fifth Battle of Ypres, the Battle of Courtrai and the Battle of the Lys and the Escaut.

At various times, it was part of the French First Army, French Second Army, French Fourth Army, French Fifth Army, French Sixth Army, French Eighth Army and French Tenth Army.

== The Battle For France ==
During the Battle of France in May 1940, the division contained the following units:

- 101st Infantry Regiment
- 103rd Infantry Regiment
- 104th Infantry Regiment
- 4th Machine Gun Battalion
- 36th Reconnaissance Battalion
- 13th Artillery Regiment
- 213th Artillery Regiment

It was a Series A Reserve division containing younger reservists.
