= Cerisy-Gailly French National Commonwealth War Graves Commission Cemetery =

World War I cemetery in Somme, France

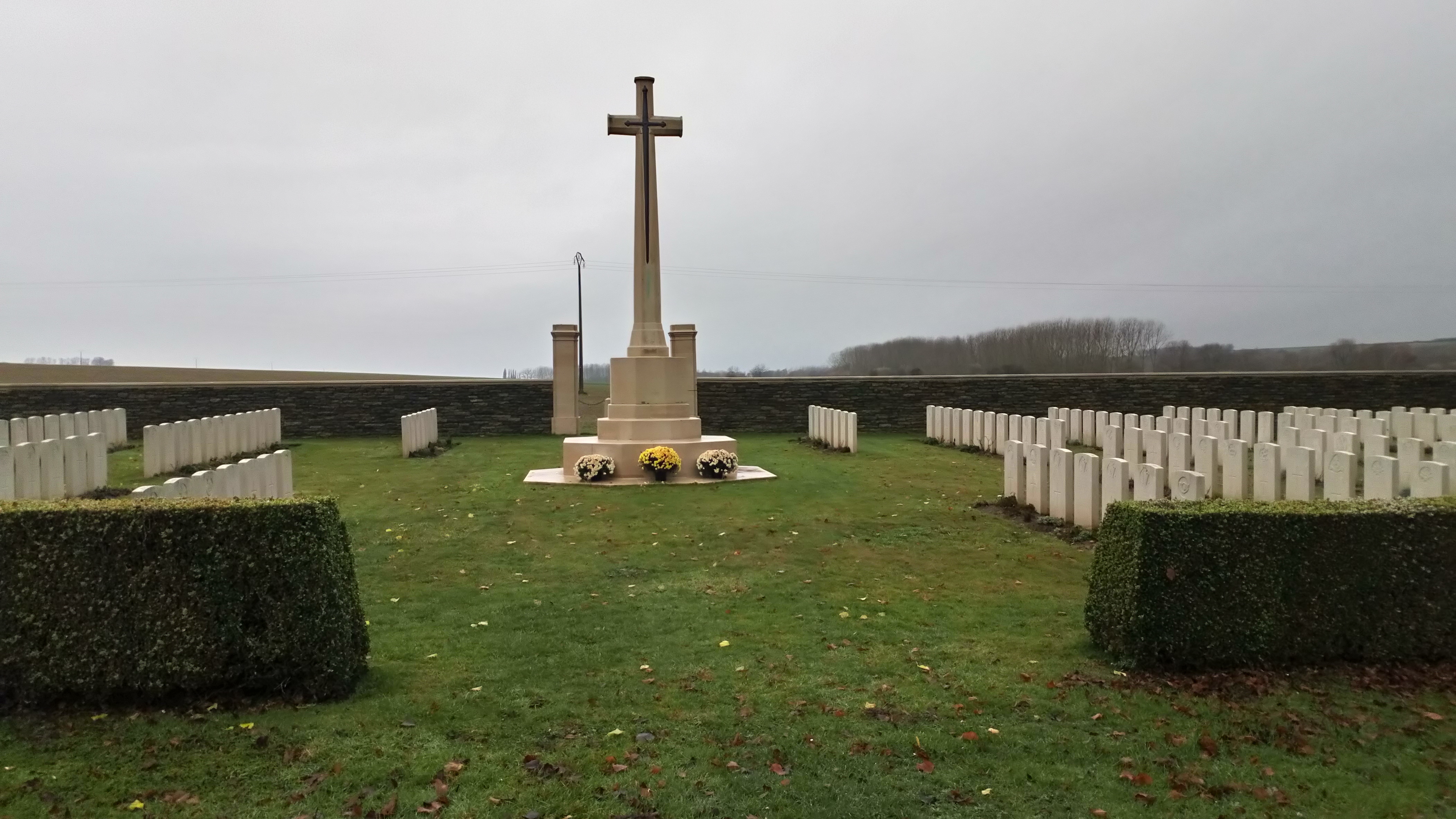

Details
- Established: February 1916
- Location: Cerisy, Somme, France
- Country: French, British and Commonwealth
- Coordinates: 49.9054°N 2.6328°E
- Type: Military
- Owned by: Commonwealth War Graves Commission
- No. of graves: 393 total, 97 identified
- Website: cwgc.org
- Find a Grave: Cerisy-Gailly French National Commonwealth War Graves Commission Cemetery

The Cerisy-Gailly French National Commonwealth War Graves Commission Cemetery (also known as the Cerisy-Gailly French National Cemetery) is a military cemetery located in the Somme region of France commemorating French, British, and Commonwealth soldiers who fought in World War I. The cemetery contains mostly soldiers who died fighting in the Battle of the Somme and manning the front line near the villages of Cerisy and Gailly between May 1917 and August 1918. The cemetery is managed by the Commonwealth War Graves Commission.

== Location ==
The cemetery is located in the village of Cerisy, which is approximately 10 kilometers south of Albert, France on the D42 and D71 roads.

== Establishment of the Cemetery ==
The cemetery was begun in February 1916 by the French Tenth Army. The British 39th and 13th Casualty Clearing Stations were stationed in Gailly in early 1917, and the 41st Stationary Hospital from May 1917 to March 1918. The villages of Cerisy and Gailly were taken by the Germans in their 1918 spring offensive, but were retaken by the Australian Corps in August 1918. After the end of the war, graves from other Somme battlefields and the Buire Communal Cemetery Extension were reburied in the cemetery. The cemetery was designed by Sir Edwin Lutyens and George Hartley Goldsmith.

=== Statistics ===
A total of 393 Commonwealth soldiers are buried in the cemetery, of which 97 are identified and 296 are unidentified. A total of 990 French soldiers are buried in the French section of the cemetery.

Identified Burials by Nationality
Nationality	Number of Burials
French	990
United Kingdom	344
Australia	44
Canada	4
New Zealand	1
