= Second Battle of Champagne =

1915 battle during the First World War

- Part of the Western Front of the First World War
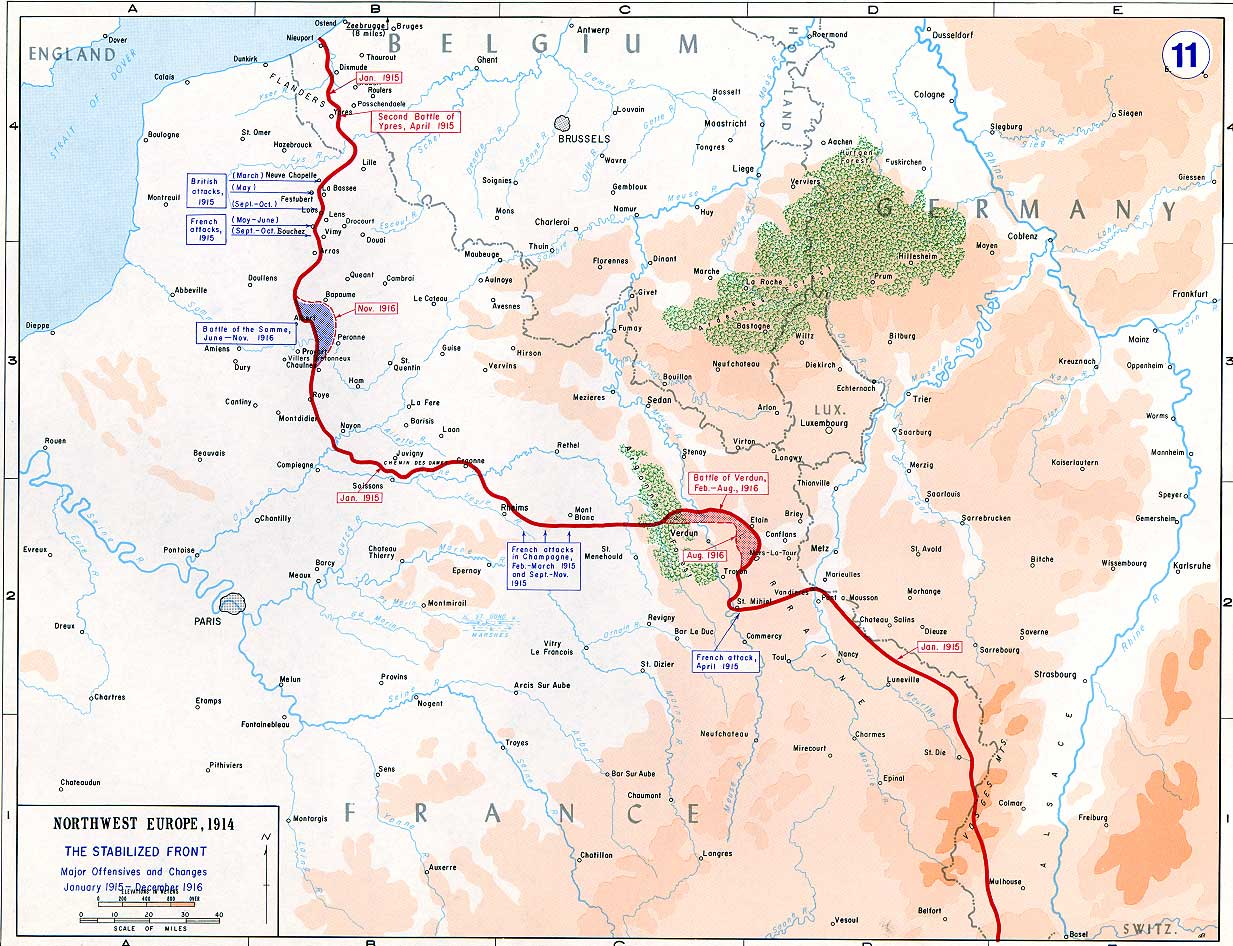
- Western Front, 1915–1916
Date	25 September – 6 November 1915
Location	Champagne, France 49°11′04″N 04°32′39″E
Result	German victory

Belligerents
France	German Empire

Commanders and leaders
Joseph Joffre; Philippe Pétain	Erich von Falkenhayn; Karl von Einem

Strength
Fourth Army; Second Army; (27 divisions)	3rd Army; (19 divisions)

Casualties and losses
145,000	72,500–97,000; 25,000 (POW)
- Champagne-Ardenne, a former administrative region of France

The Second Battle of Champagne (French: Bataille de Champagne, German: Herbstschlacht, [Autumn Battle]) in the First World War was a French offensive against the German army in Champagne that coincided with the Third Battle of Artois in the north and ended in a German victory.

== Battle ==
On 25 September 1915, twenty divisions of the Second Army and Fourth Army of Groupe d'armées du Centre (GAC, Central Army Group Général Édouard de Castelnau), attacked at 9:15 a.m., with each division on a 1,500–2,000 yd (1,400–1,800 m) front. A second echelon of seven divisions followed, with one infantry division and six cavalry divisions in reserve. Six German divisions held the line opposite, in the front position and the R-Stellung (Rückstellung, Reserve Position) further back. French artillery observers benefited from good weather but on the night of 24/25 September, heavy rain began and fell until noon.

The German front position was overrun in four places and two of the penetrations reached as far as the R-Stellung, where uncut barbed wire prevented the French from advancing further. In one part of the line, the French artillery barrage continued after the first German line had been taken, causing French casualties. The French took 14,000 prisoners and several guns but French casualties were also high; the Germans had anticipated the French attack, having been able to watch the French preparations from the high ground. The main German defensive effort was made at the R-Stellung, behind which the bulk of the German field artillery had been withdrawn. A supporting attack by the French Third Army on the Aisne took no ground. German reserves, directed by Erich von Falkenhayn, the Chief of the German general staff, plugged gaps in the German lines.

The French commander-in-chief, Joseph Joffre, allotted two reserve divisions to the GAC and ordered the Groupe d'armées de l'Est (GAE, Eastern Army Group) to send all 75 mm field gun ammunition, except for 500 rounds per gun, to the Second and Fourth armies. On 26 September, the French attacked again, closed up to the R-Stellung on a 7.5 mi (12.1 km) front and gained a foothold in one place. Another 2,000 German troops were captured and attacks against the R-Stellung from 27 to 29 September, broke through on 28 September. A German counter-attack the next day recaptured the ground, most of which was on a reverse slope, that deprived the French artillery of ground observation. Joffre suspended the offensive until more ammunition could be supplied and ordered that the captured ground be consolidated and cavalry units withdrawn. Smaller French attacks against German salients continued from 30 September to 5 October.

On 3 October, Joffre abandoned the attempt at a breakthrough in Champagne, ordering the local commanders to fight a battle of attrition, then terminated the offensive on 6 November. The offensive had advanced the French line for about 2.5 mi (4 km), at a cost of c. 100,000 French and British (in Artois) casualties against less German casualties. The French had attacked in Champagne with 35 divisions against the equivalent of 16 German divisions. On the Champagne front, the Fourth, Second and Third armies had fired 2,842,400 field artillery and 577,700 heavy shells, which, with the consumption during the Third Battle of Artois in the north, exhausted the French stock of ammunition.

== Aftermath ==
=== Analysis ===
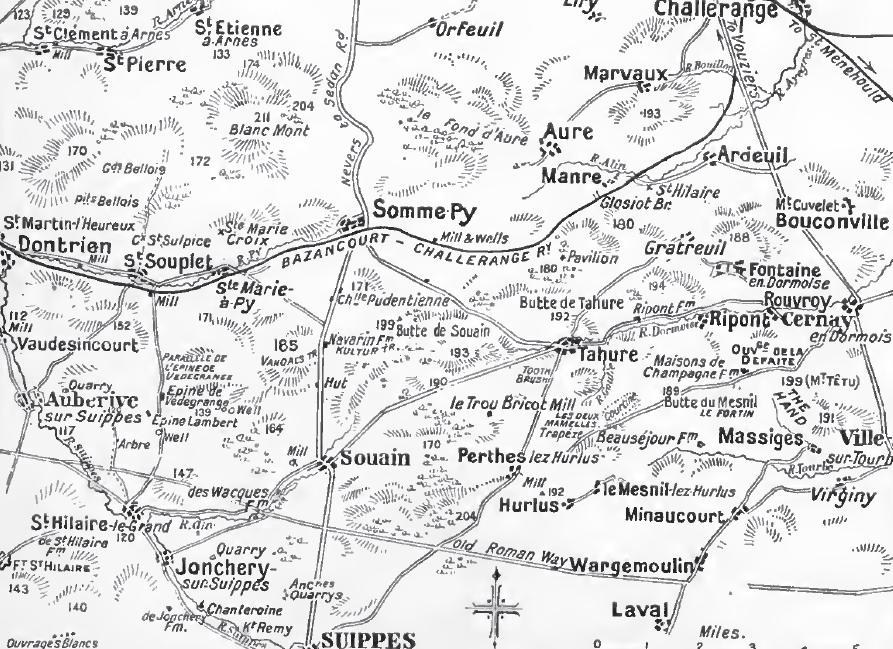
Champagne battlefront, 1915

French methods and equipment were insufficient for the demands of trench warfare and a lull followed as the French rested the survivors of the offensive, replaced losses and accumulated more equipment and ammunition. French artillery had been unable to destroy the German artillery, often situated on reverse slopes of the Champagne hills. Some French regiments attacked with bands playing and their regimental flags waving. On 22 October, Joffre claimed that the autumn offensive had resulted in important tactical gains, inflicted many casualties and achieved a moral superiority over the Germans and that only a lack of artillery had led to the failure to achieve the strategic objectives of the offensive. To keep as many German troops as possible away from the Eastern Front, offensive operations must continue but troops in the front line were to be kept to the minimum over the winter and a new strategy was to be formulated.

The theoretical bases of the French offensives of 1915 had been collected in But et conditions d'une action offensive d'ensemble (Purpose and Conditions of Mass Offensive Action, 16 April 1915) and its derivative, Note 5779, which were compiled from analyses of reports received from the front since 1914. The document contained instructions on infiltration tactics, rolling barrages and poison gas, which were to be used systematically in continuous battles to create rupture. (Note: Reviews of the experiences of the offensives led to a new formulation, Instruction sur le combat offensif des grandes unités (Instruction on the Offensive Battle of Large Units, 26 January 1916).) Continuous battle was to be conducted by step-by-step advances through successive German defensive positions. Methodical attacks were to be made each time and would inexorably consume German infantry reserves. The German defences would eventually collapse and make a breakthrough attack feasible. The slower, deliberate methods would conserve French infantry as they battered through the deeper defences built by the Germans since 1914.

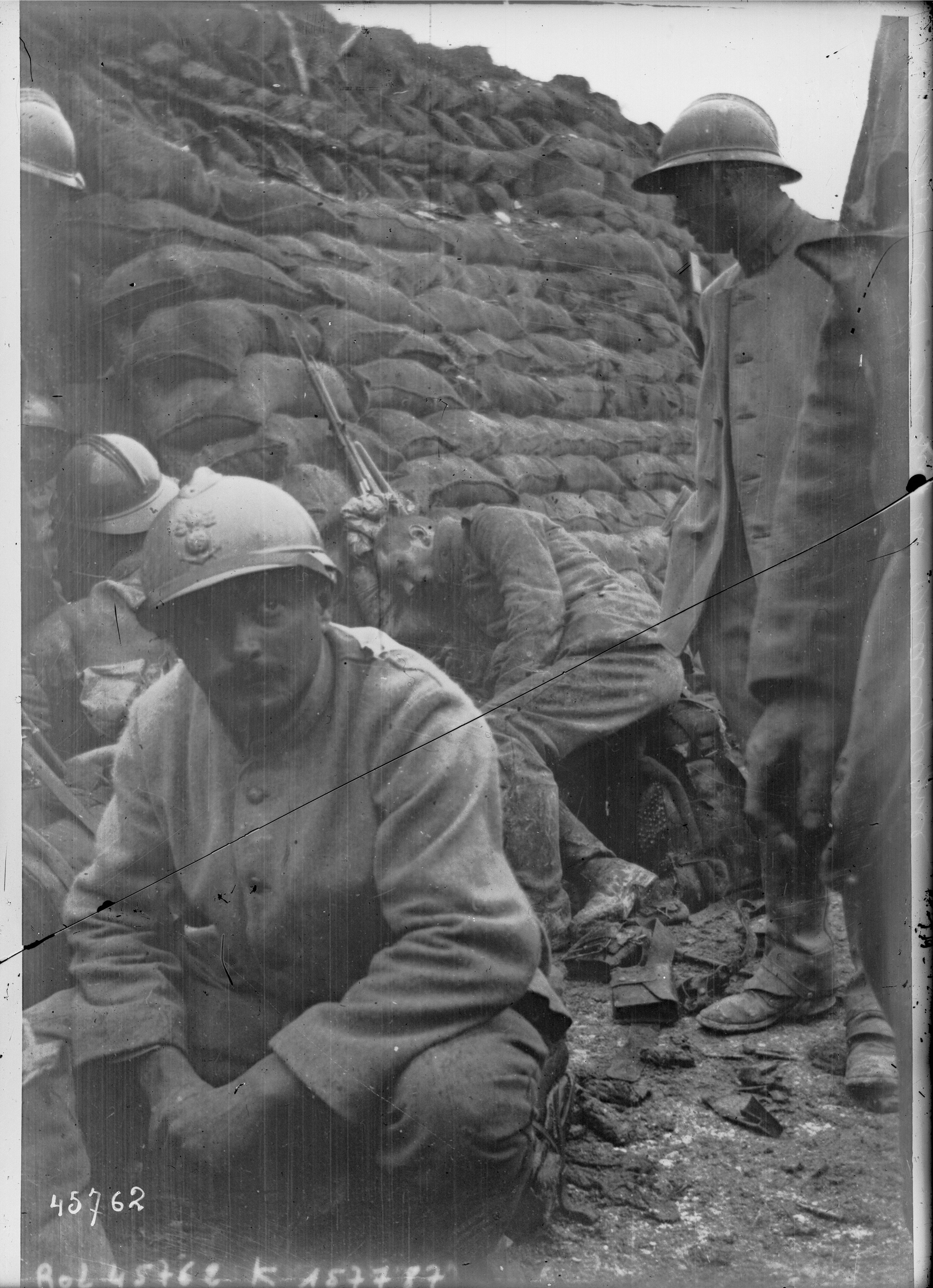
French soldiers in a trench line near Champagne (1915)

In the autumn battles, the Allies had outnumbered the Westheer (German army in the west) by 600 infantry battalions but had not achieved a breakthrough; after the first day of an attack, German reinforcements had made one impossible. Several German divisions had returned from the Eastern Front but were tired and of little value. Falkenhayn had underestimated the possibility of an offensive and kept the Oberste Heeresleitung (OHL, German army high command) reserve spread all along the Western Front, rather than concentrating it in threatened areas. French reviews of the offensive found that their reserves had moved close to the front, ready to exploit a breakthrough and had advanced on time. The troops had become bunched up with the leading divisions, blocked the lines of communication and suffered many casualties while they were held up. Communications had failed and commanders had been in ignorance of the situation, artillery co-ordination with the infantry had been poor and rain grounded French artillery-observation aircraft. Many of the French commanders concluded that a breakthrough could not be forced in one attack and that it would take several set-piece battles to make the defenders collapse and be unable to prevent a return to mobile operations.

The German report, Experiences of the 3rd Army in the Autumn Battles in the Champagne, 1915, noted that unyielding defence of the most forward positions had failed several times. The French had severely damaged German field fortifications and cut the barbed wire obstacles in front of them by long artillery bombardments. The second position had not been broken into and the 3rd Army reported that the decision to construct it had been vindicated, since the French had to suspend their attacks until artillery had been moved forward, which took until 4 October. The momentum of the initial breakthrough had not been maintained, because the French troops crowding forward had become disorganised, which made co-ordinated attacks impossible to arrange. French prisoners were reported to have said that there had been no methodical staging of the reserves to exploit a breakthrough and concluded with the view that one might still be possible.

Lack of troops made it impossible for the Germans to respond with methodical counter-attacks (Gegenangriffe) but smaller Gegenstösse (hasty counter-attacks by troops in the vicinity), had succeeded against French units weakened by losses, which had not had time to consolidate captured ground. It was recommended that such reserves should be made available by reducing the number of German troops in the front line, as one man every 6 ft 7 in – 9 ft 10 in (2–3 m) was enough. Co-operation between all arms, assistance from neighbouring sectors and the exploitation of flanking moves had defeated the French offensive. More intermediate strong points, built for all-round defence, were recommended between the first and second positions. Defence of the first position was still the intention but deeper defences would dissipate the effect of a breakthrough and force the attackers to make numerous individual attacks on ground where local knowledge and the preparation of defences would be advantageous to the defenders. Observation posts should be made secure from attack, reconnaissance reports acted on promptly and communication links were to be made as robust as possible. A wide field of fire was unnecessary and to be dispensed with, to make each part of the position defensible by placing it on reverse slopes, concealed from ground observation.

In his memoirs (1919), Falkenhayn wrote that the Herbstschlacht (Autumn Battle) showed that on the Western Front, quantity was not enough to defeat armies sheltering in field defences

.... the lessons to be deduced from the failure of our enemies' mass attacks are decisive against any imitation of their battle methods. Attempts at a mass breakthrough, even with the extreme accumulation of men and material, cannot be regarded as holding out the prospects of success.

and that the plans made earlier in 1915 for an offensive in France were obsolete. Falkenhayn needed to resolve the paradoxical lessons of the war since 1914, to find a way to end it favourably for Germany, which culminated at Battle of Verdun in 1916, when Falkenhayn tried to induce the French to repeat the costly failure of the Second Battle of Champagne.

=== Casualties ===
The offensive had been disappointing for the French. Despite their new 'attack in echelon' they had only made quick progress during the time it took for the Germans to strip reserves from elsewhere and rush them up. The French suffered 145,000 casualties, against 72,500 German casualties, (Foley gave 97,000 casualties based on Der Weltkrieg, the German Official History). The French had taken 25,000 prisoners and captured 150 guns. In Der Weltkrieg, the German official history, French casualties in the Fourth, Second and Third armies from 25 September to 7 October were given as 143,567. Another 48,230 casualties were suffered by the Tenth Army from 25 September to 15 October and 56,812 casualties in the British First Army from 25 September to 16 October, a total of c. 250,000 casualties against c. 150,000 in the German armies, of which 81,000 casualties were suffered in the Champagne battle from 22 September to 14 October. The French Official History recorded 191,795 casualties in the fighting in Champagne and Artois. In 2024, Alan MacDonald wrote that the French suffered 145,000 casualties against 73,000 German and that in the autumn battles the French suffered 134,000 dead, missing and prisoners and 279,000 wounded.
