= British and French forces in Italy during World War I =

British and French World War I military forces

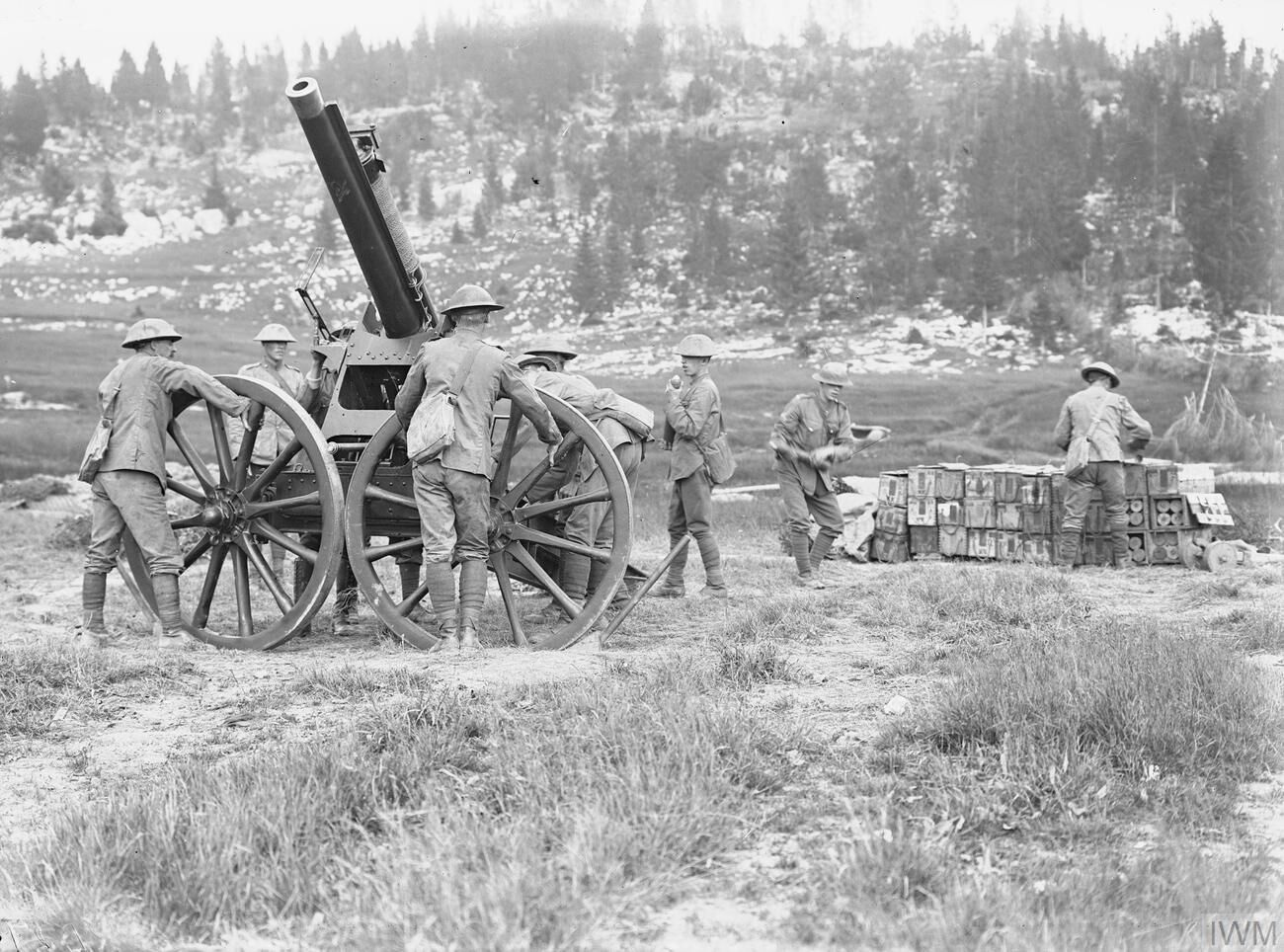
Gunners of the Royal Artillery laying and loading a 13-pounder (9 cwt) anti-aircraft gun in Italy, 1918.

During World War I, both Britain and France sent military forces to Italy in October 1917.

Following the Battle of Caporetto (24 October to 19 November 1917), the Italian Front collapsed. In order to ensure this did not lead to Italy withdrawing from the war the Allies organised forces to reinforce the Italians. As the battle unfolded, General Luigi Cadorna invoked the agreement reached at the Chantilly Conference of December 1915. There the Allies had agreed that should any of the allies come under threat, the other allies would support them.

The first French troops arrived on 27 October 1917. The first British troops followed them after a few days. Fearing that his troops would be overrun and lost in case the Italian lines on the Piave river would be broken by the Austro-Hungarian and German forces, however, General Ferdinand Foch refused to commit them to the frontline until the Italian troops had halted the Central Powers' troops by themselves and firmly established a defensive line on the Piave river. The British were thus kept in reserve during the First Battle of the Piave (November 1917) and only saw action from December 1917 onwards.

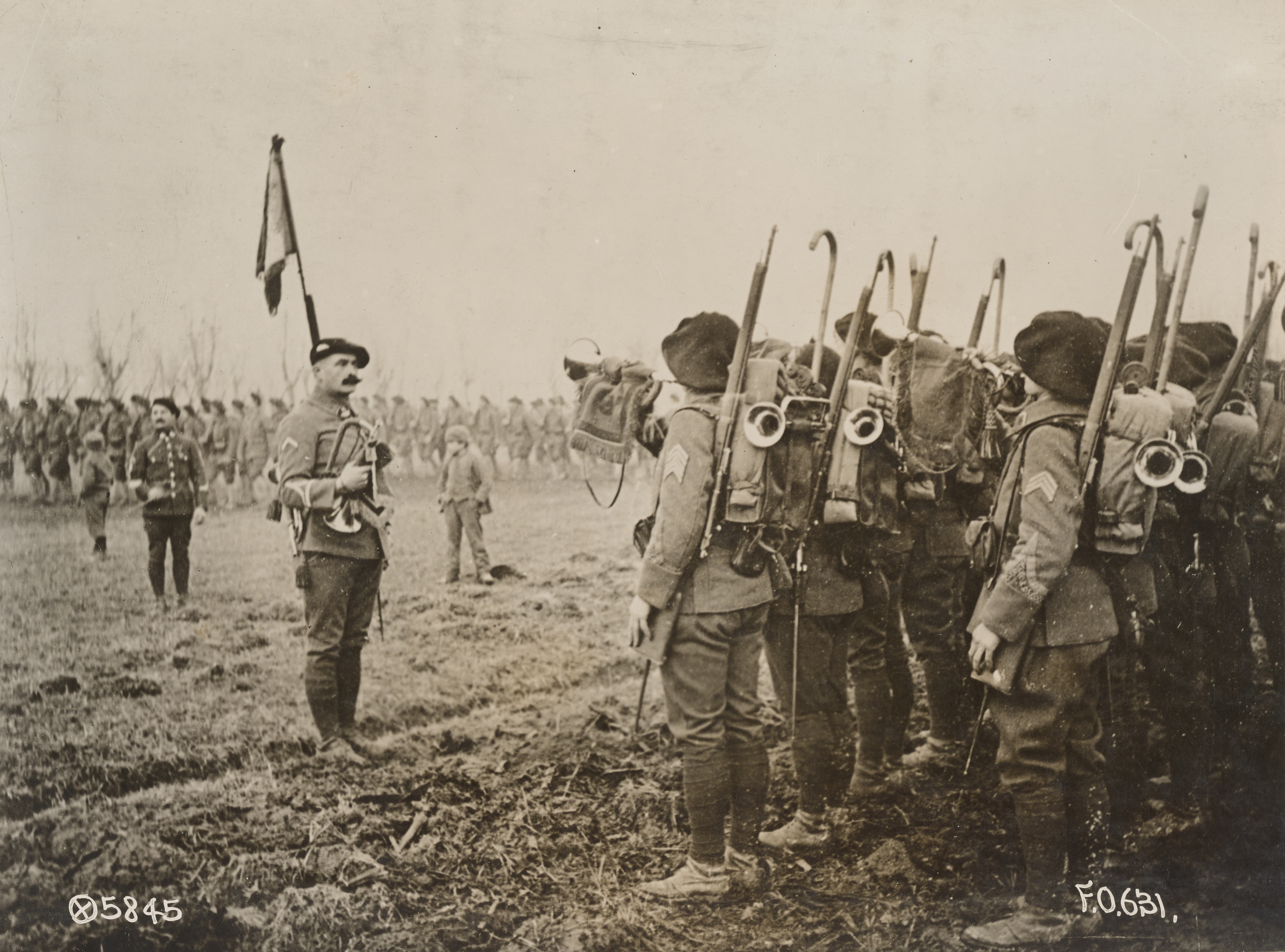
Chasseurs Alpins of the 47th Division in review order at the start of 1918, following their victory at Monte Tomba. The division was reviewed by the king of Italy in January 1918 and again March.

The French expeditionary force (fr:Forces françaises en Italie) consisted primarily of the French Tenth Army with the addition of the 12th Army Corps and 31st Army Corps. (Note: The French units were (i) 12th Army Corps (France) (ii) 10th Army (France) and (iii) 31st Army Corps (France) comprising (1) 23rd Division, 24th Division, (2) 46th Division, 47th Division and (3) 64th Division, 65th Division respectively.) They took up station around Verona. Four of the six French divisions (46e, 47e, 64e, 65e) were to return to the Western Front in spring 1918, with the two divisions of 12th Corps remaining in Italy.

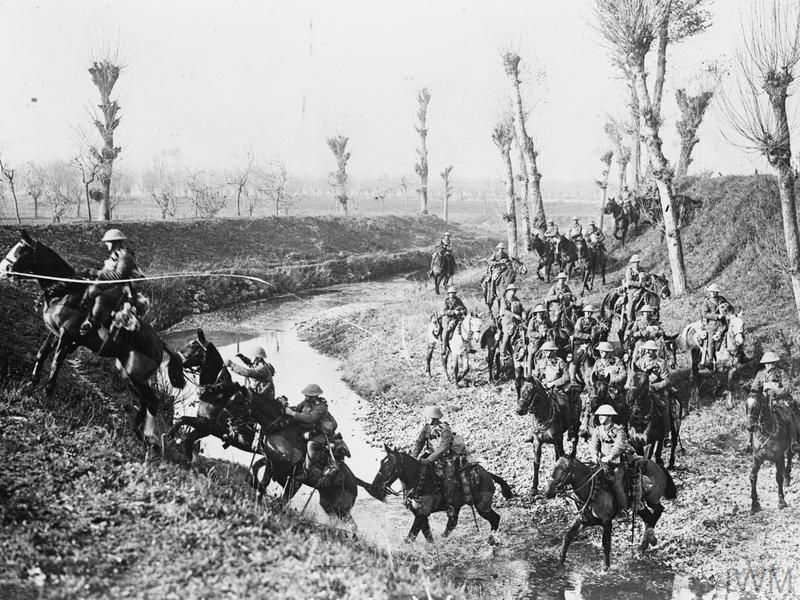
Patrol of the Northamptonshire Yeomanry crossing a stream in Italy, 1918.

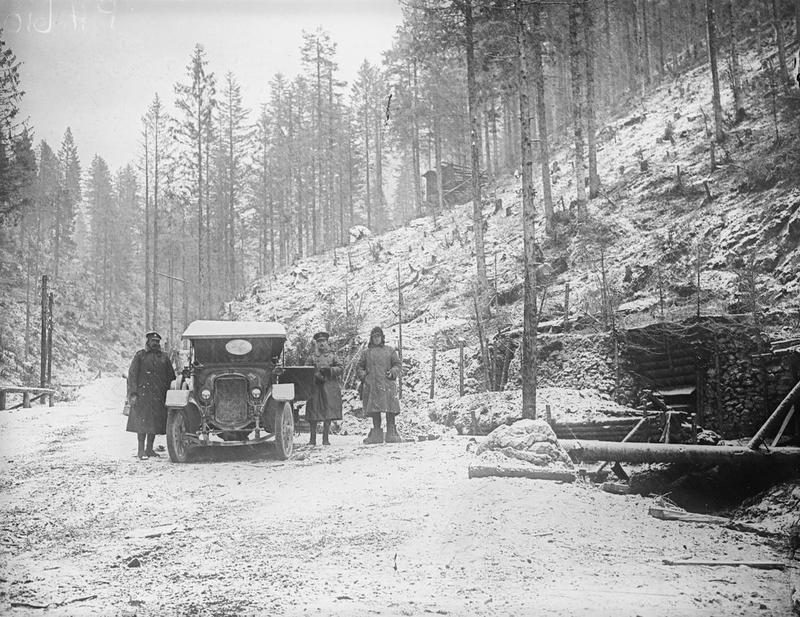
The Val di Portule captured by the 48th Division, 2 November 1918.

The British Expeditionary Force (Italy) came under the command of General Sir Herbert Plumer, who had formerly commanded the Second Army on the Western Front. The principal units in the BEF(I) were the XIV Corps and the XI Corps, which controlled the 23rd, 41st, 7th, 48th and 5th divisions. The 5th Division returned to France on 1 March 1918, followed by the 41st Division in April, along with XI Corps headquarters. Lieutenant General The Earl of Cavan was appointed as Plumer's successor as commander-in-chief of British Forces in Italy on 10 March, comprising the three divisions of Cavan's old XIV Corps.
