= François Anthoine =

French Army general

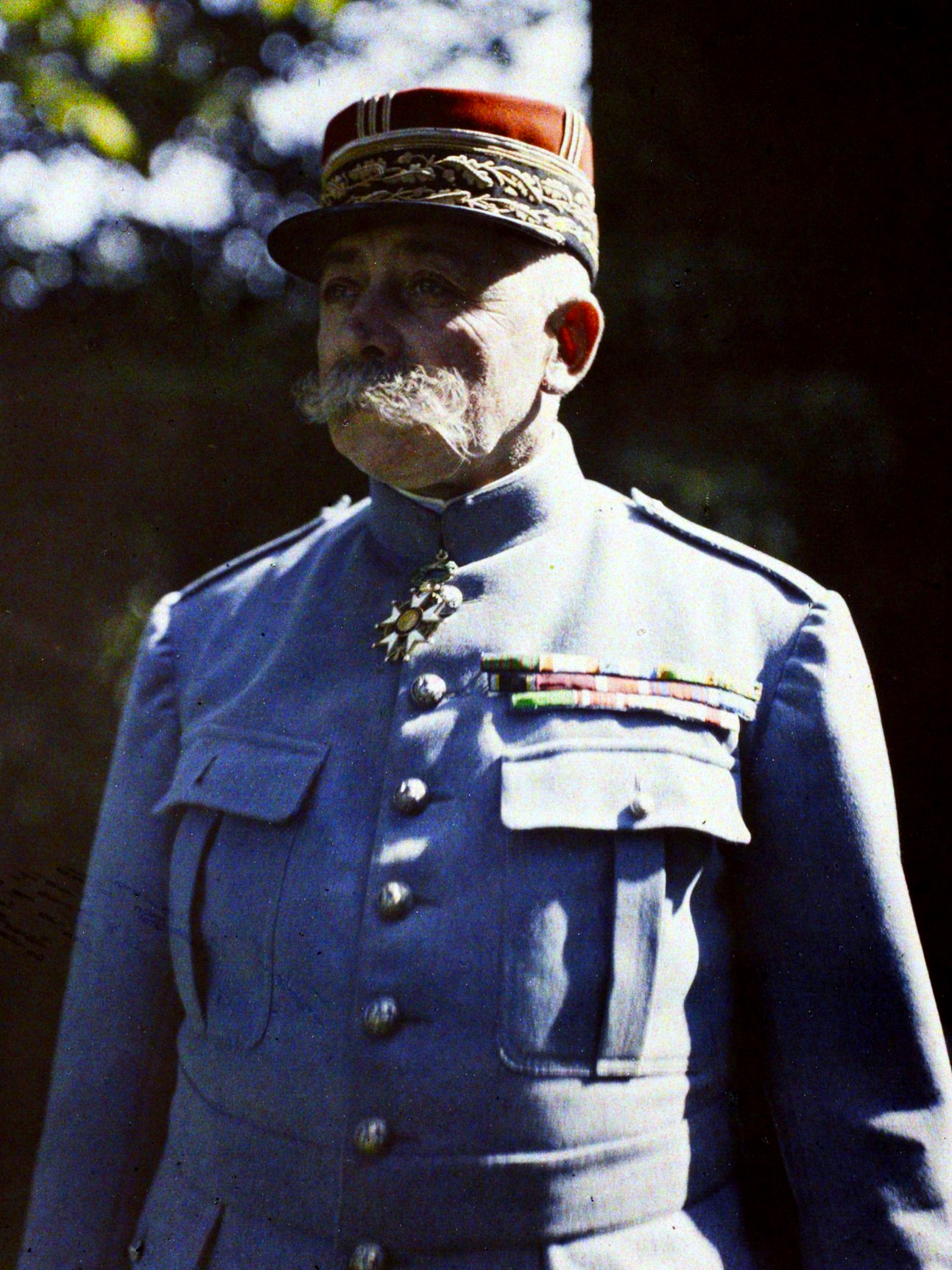
- François Anthoine in 1917. Autochrome by Paul Castelneau.
- Born: 28 February 1860; Le Mans, France
- Died: 25 December 1944 (aged 84); Paris, France
- Military career
- Allegiance: France
- Branch: French Army
- Service years: 1881–1921
- Rank: Général
- Commands: 1st Army (1917); 4th Army (1917); 10th Army Corps (1915–17); 20th Division (1914–15)
- Conflicts: Tonkin campaign First World War
- Awards: Grand Cross of the Legion of Honour; Croix de guerre Grand Cross of the Order of the Crown (Belgium); Croix de guerre (Belgium); Grand Officer of the Order of Saints Maurice and Lazarus (Italy)

François Paul Anthoine (28 February 1860 – 25 December 1944) was a French Army general during the First World War. When the war began, Anthoine was General Noël Castelnau's Chief of Staff (Second Army). Anthoine played an important role in the Nivelle Offensive in spring 1917.

Anthoine was eventually promoted to command the Fourth Army in March 1917 then the First Army in June 1917. At the Third Battle of Ypres in autumn 1917, Anthoine and the First Army participated in the attacks on the northern flank of the salient and guarding the BEF flank from German attack across the Yser Canal. The Second Army (Herbert Plumer) was given a parallel task, attacking the southern flank of the salient and guarding the BEF's southern flank. Anthoine then served as chief of staff to Philippe Pétain, French commander in chief but was dismissed as he was thought "too pessimistic" after the near catastrophe of the Third Battle of the Aisne in May 1918. After this sacking, François Anthoine died many years later in 1944.
