= General Gerard =

General Gerard may refer to:

- Augustin Gérard (1857–1926), French Army général de division
- Étienne Maurice Gérard (1773–1852), French Army général de division
- Charles Gerard, 2nd Earl of Macclesfield (c. 1659–1701), French-born English major general
