= 18th Army Corps (France) =

French Army corps (1870-1940)

18e Corps de Armée
- Active: 1870-1940
- Country: France
- Type: Army Corps
- Engagements: World War II

Commanders
- Notable commanders: Charles-Denis Bourbaki; Louis de Maud'huy; Auguste Hirschauer; Jean César Graziani

The French 18th Army Corps was a French military unit created in November 1870 by the vice admiral Fourichon.

== History ==
The 18th Army Corps (18e Corps d’Armée) was formally organised by the decrees of 28 September 1873 and 2 August 1874, issued under the presidency of the French Third Republic to complete the post-war reorganisation of the army into eighteen metropolitan corps and one in Algeria.

== Commanders ==
=== 1870s ===
- 1870 : Général Crouzat
- 1870 : Général Abdelal
- 1870 : Général Bourbaki
- 1870 : Général Billot
- 1873 : Général d'Aurelle de Paladines
- 1874 - 1877 : Général de Rochebouët
- 1878 : Général Berthaut

=== World War I ===
- General de Maud’huy (4 September 1914 – 29 September 1914)
- General Marjoulet (30 September 1914 – 19 June 1916)
- General Hirschauer (20 June 1916 – 21 August 1917)
- General d'Armau de Pouydraguin (22 August 1917 – 25 November 1920)
- General Graziani (1 December 1920 – 26 November 1921)

=== World War II ===
- September 1939 : Général Rochard
- May - June 1940 : Général Doyen
- June - July 1940 : Général Viant

== Sources ==
- Journal militaire officiel (in French). J. Dumaine. 1874.
