= Paul Maistre =

French general

Paul André Marie Maistre
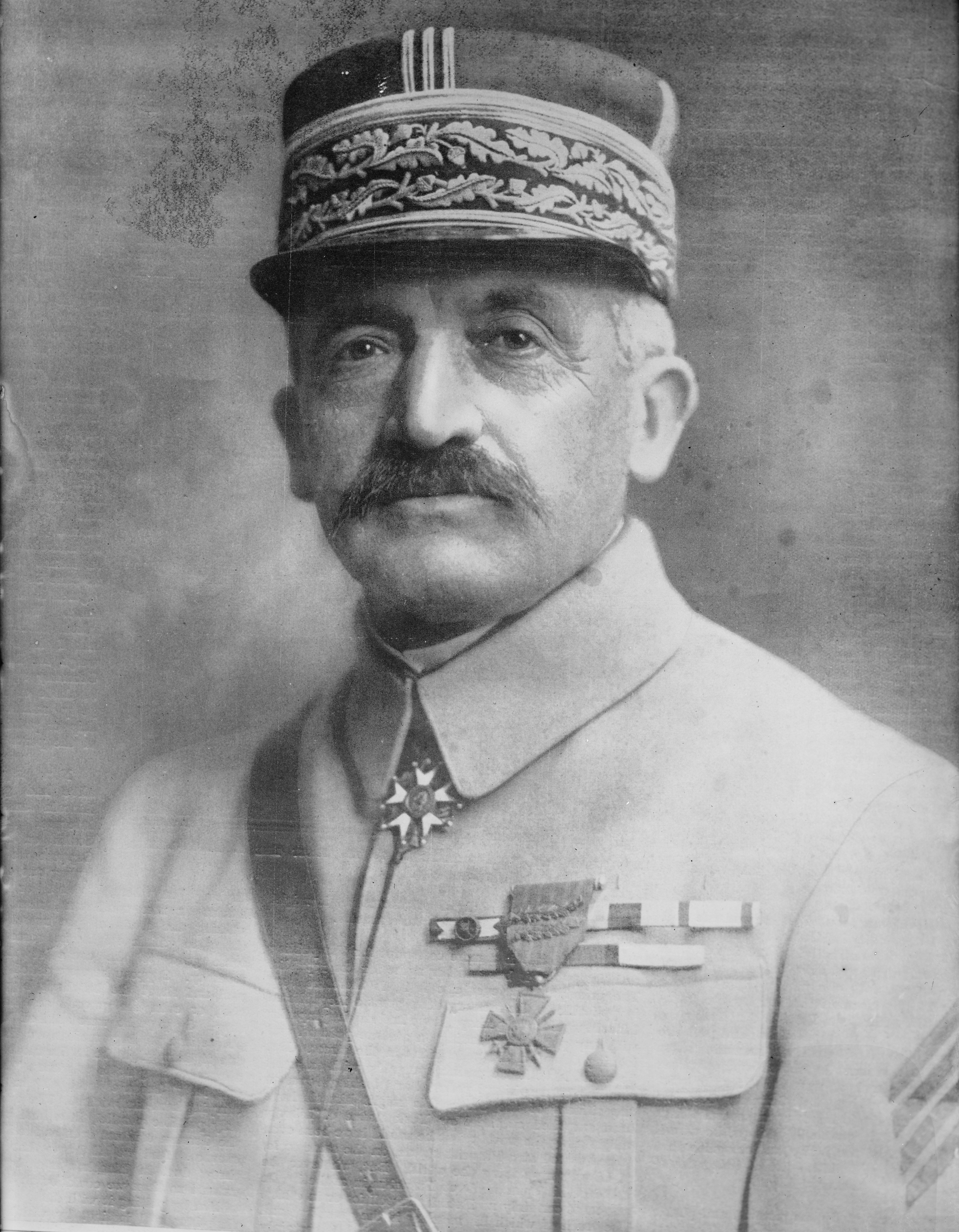
- Born: 20 June 1858; Joinville, Haute-Marne
- Died: July 25, 1922 (aged 64); Paris

Monument to General Maistre and the 21st Army Corps at Ablain-Saint-Nazaire

Paul André Marie Maistre (20 June 1858 – 25 July 1922) was a highly decorated French general who fought in World War I. He graduated from Saint Cyr in 1877, first in his class. He later returned as an instructor. He was promoted to captain in 1887, major in 1898, and general in 1912. In 1914 he was chief of staff for the Fourth Army. When the war began he was promoted to general of division and took command of XXI Corps, fighting numerous battles on the Western Front. In May 1917 Maistre was given command of the Sixth Army after the failure of the Nivelle Offensive. His combat troops, however, were mutinous, and let known their opposition to his planned offensive against the German line. He backed down. By June 1917, there was serious unrest in 11 of his 17 divisions. By October 1917, however, he had restored discipline and went on the offensive. He was victorious at Battle of La Malmaison.

Maistre briefly commanded French forces in Italy, but in Spring of 1918 he was given command of the Tenth Army on the Western Front, with orders to stop the Ludendorff German spring offensive. Maistre played a major role in the Allied counter-offensive in July, where he commanded Army Group Center. He was the victor of the Second Battle of the Marne. After the war in 1920 he became General Inspector of Infantry, and died in that role.

== Commands ==
During World War I, he commanded

- the XXI Army Corps (12/09/14 - 01/05/17),
- the French Sixth Army (4/05/17 - 11/12/17), including at the Battle of La Malmaison,
- the French Tenth Army ( 11/12/17 - 10/06/18),
- the French Forces in Italy (14/02/18 - 31/03/18),
- the Army Group North (10/06/18 – 06/07/1918)
- the Army Group Centre (06/07/1918 - end of the war).
