= Marcel Garchery =

Jeanny-Jules-Marcel Garchery (16 June 1876 – 25 April 1961) was a French general. At various times in his career, he served as Chief of Staff, Army of the Orient (Levant), he commanded the 25th Division and then the 14th Military Region. His final duty post was Commander 8th Army.
