= Auguste Hirschauer =

French general (1857–1943)

General Auguste-Édouard Hirschauer, Chief of French Military Aeronautics, contemplating changes to the French Aviation Service, 1917

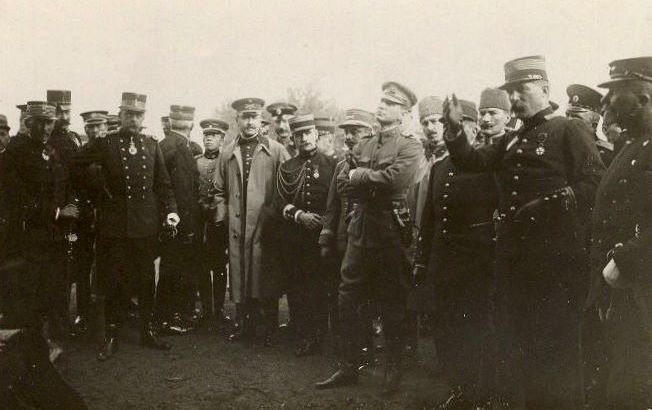
With Mustafa Kemal Bey (Atatürk) during the Picardie army manoeuvres (September 1910).

André Auguste Édouard Hirschauer (16 June 1857 in Saint-Avold, Moselle, France – 27 December 1943 in Versailles, Yvelines, France) was a French lieutenant general in the First World War and from 1920 to 1936 representative of Lorraine in the Senate.

At the start of 1914, General Hirschauer was in command of a brigade of balloons comprising the 5th and 8th Combat Engineer Regiments of Versailles. On 8 February he was appointed Chief of Staff of Paris dealing with engineering of the area southwest of Paris and worked under the command of General Gallieni.

But at the outbreak of the war, Hirschauer requested to be sent to the front. He became commander of the 29th Infantry Brigade, and then the 63rd Infantry Division. Promoted to Major-General, he was put in charge of the 18th Army Corps and later the 9th Army Corps. He took part in the battle of the Ourcq, the 2nd battle of Champagne & the battle of Verdun. He took Craonne in 1917. He did a triumphal entry into Mulhouse the 17 November 1918. He ended the war as commander of the Second Army.

After the armistice, he was named governor of Strasbourg and retired from service in 1919. He won the senate election in Moselle the 11 January 1920. He was reelected in 1924 and 1932.

== Publications ==
- Auguste-Édouard Hirschauer, Paris en état de défense 1914
- Auguste-Édouard Hirschauer, Les armées aériennes 1927

Military offices
Preceded by Pierre Roques	Permanent Inspector of Military Aeronautics; 1912-1913	Succeeded by Félix Paul Antoine Bernard
Preceded by Félix Paul Antoine Bernard	Director of Military Aeronautics; 1914-1915	Vacant Title next held by Henry Jacques Regnier; In 1916
