= List of French armies in World War I =

French army formations in World War I include:

- 1st Army
- 2nd Army
- 3rd Army
- 4th Army
- 5th Army
- 6th Army
- 7th Army
- 8th Army
- 9th Army
- 10th Army
- Armée d'Orient

== See also ==
- Lists of armies
