= Army Group Centre (France) =

World War I French military grouping

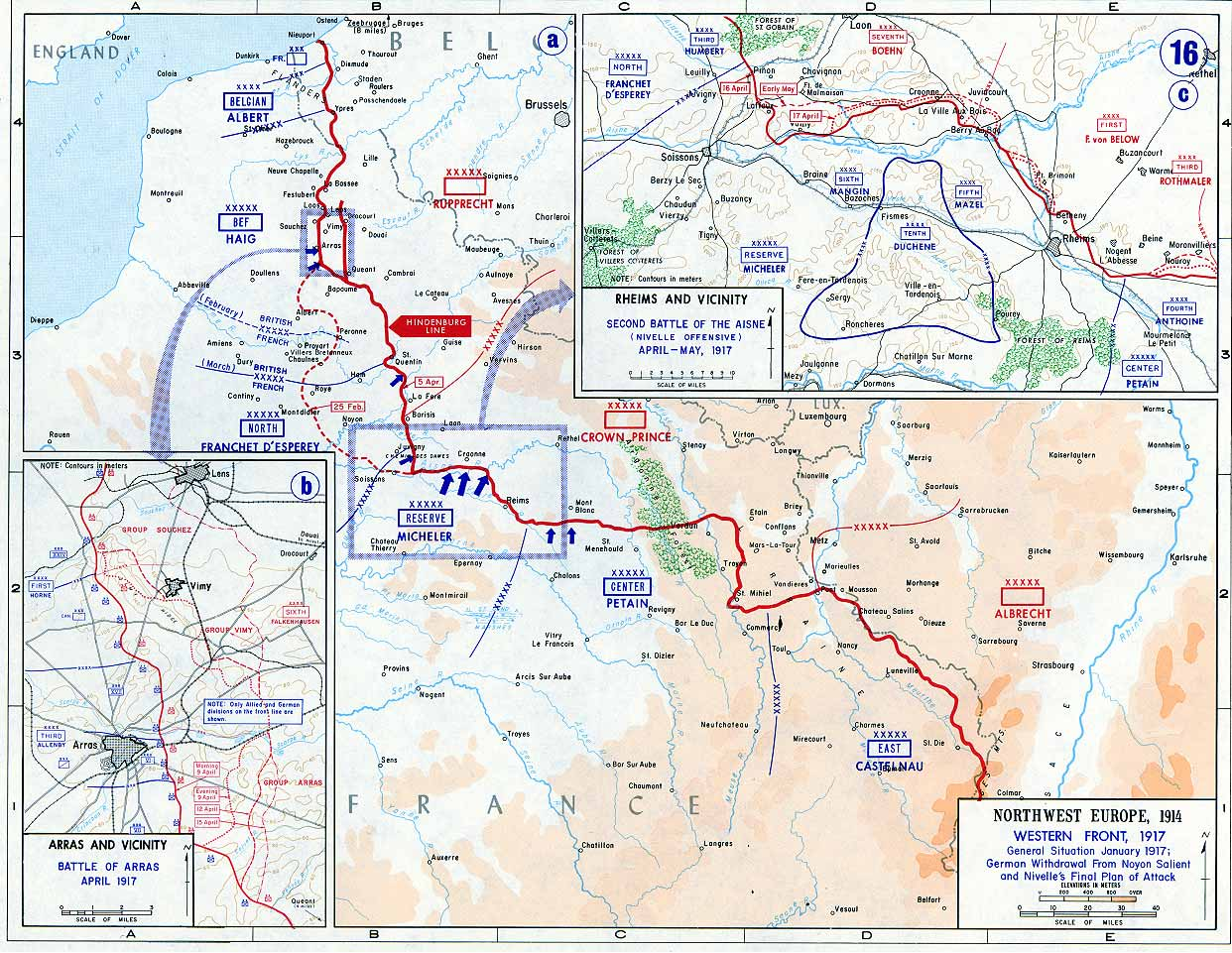
Situation of the Army Group Center in 1917

Army Group Centre (French: Groupe d'armées du Centre, G. A. C.) was a grouping of French field armies during World War I, which was created on June 22, 1915. The army group covered the Western Front roughly between Rheims and Verdun.

The G.A.C. was then disbanded on December 1, 1917, and a second one—also known as Army Group Maistre—was created by transforming the Army Group North on July 6, 1918. General Paul Maistre was its last commander until the Armistice.

== Composition ==
=== July 1, 1915 ===
from North to South :

- 6th Army (général Pierre Joseph Dubois)
- 5th Army (général Louis Franchet d'Espèrey)
- 4th Army (général Fernand de Langle de Cary)

=== February 15, 1917 ===
From West to East :

- 4th Army (général Pierre Roques)
- 2nd Army (général Adolphe Guillaumat)

== Commanders ==
- Général Édouard de Castelnau (June 22, 1915 – December 12, 1915)
- Général Fernand de Langle de Cary (December 12, 1915 – May 2, 1916)
- Général Philippe Pétain (May 2, 1916 – May 4, 1917)
- Général Émile Fayolle (May 4, 1917 – December 1, 1917)
- Général Paul Maistre (July 6, 1918 – December 1918)

== Sources ==
- The French Army and the First World War by Elizabeth Greenhalgh
- Philippe Pétain et Marc Ferro (Avant-propos), La Guerre mondiale : 1914–1918, Toulouse, Éditions Privat, 2014, 372 p. (ISBN 978-2-708-96961-2, OCLC 891408727)
