= Augustin Gérard =

French soldier (1857–1926)

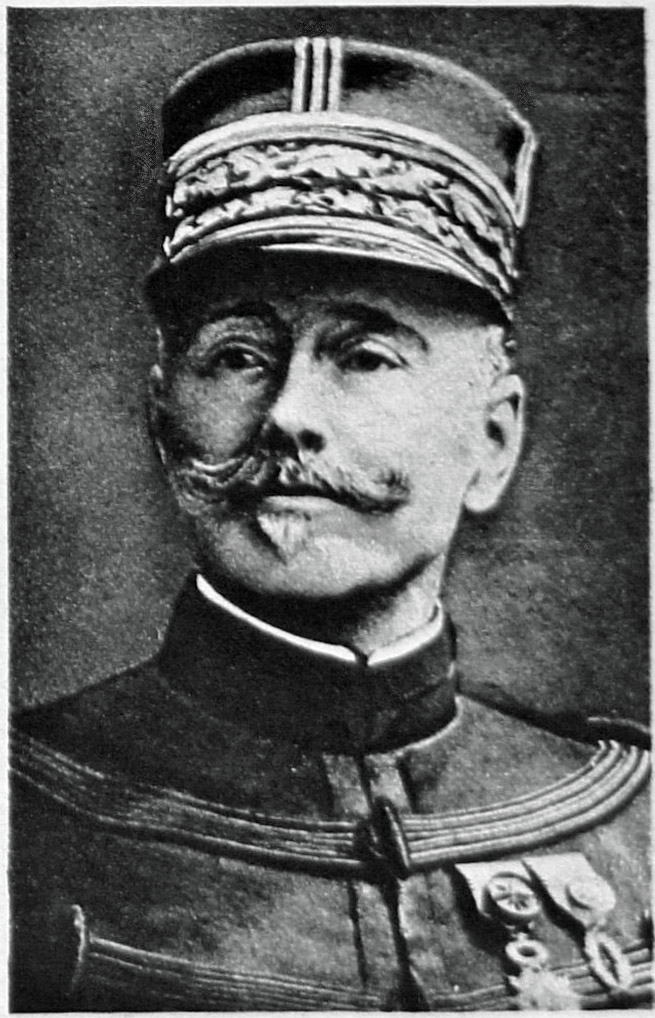
- Gérard in 1915
- Born: 2 November 1857; Dunkirk, France
- Died: 2 November 1926 (aged 69); Château-Gontier, France
- Burial place: Les Invalides, Paris
- Military career
- Allegiance: France
- Branch: French Army
- Service years: 1875–1919
- Rank: Divisional general
- Commands: 41st Infantry Division; 2nd Army Corps; First Army; Eighth Army
- Conflicts: World War I

Divisional-General Augustin Gérard (2 November 1857 – 2 November 1926) was a French Army officer who served in World War I.

== Life ==
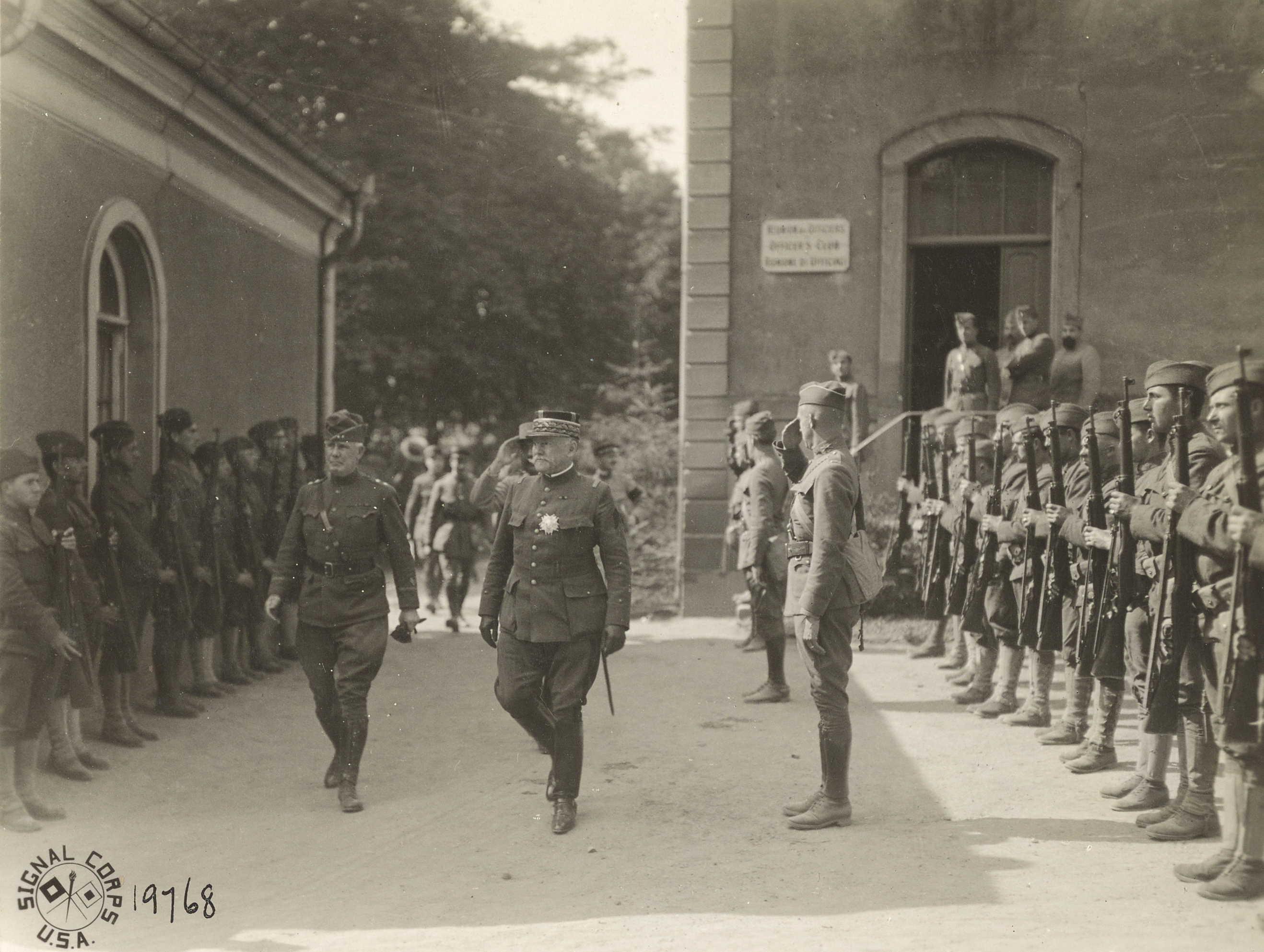
General Augustin Gérard, commanding the French Eighth Army, accompanied by Major General George B. Duncan, commanding the U.S. 77th Division, leaving the 77th's headquarters and passing by its Guard of Honor, Baccarat, France, June 1918.

His first important assignment was Chief of Staff of general Joseph Gallieni in Madagascar. In May 1912 he became commander of the 41st Infantry Division and by the outbreak of World War I, he was in charge of the 2nd Army Corps, with which he fought the Battle of the Ardennes and the First Battle of the Marne.

On 24 July 1915, he became commander of the Army Detachment of Lorraine, which was later renamed to Eighth Army. Between 31 March and 31 December 1916 he was in charge of the First Army, after which he returned to the Eighth Army for the rest of the war.

He commanded the Eighth Army for an initial period during the occupation of the Rhineland until he retired on 21 October 1919. During this period he supported the separatist movement and advocated the formation of an independent Pfalz republic.

Master of the Grand Orient de France in 1921 and 1922.

He died in 1926 and was buried in Les Invalides in Paris.
