= Antoine Baucheron de Boissoudy =

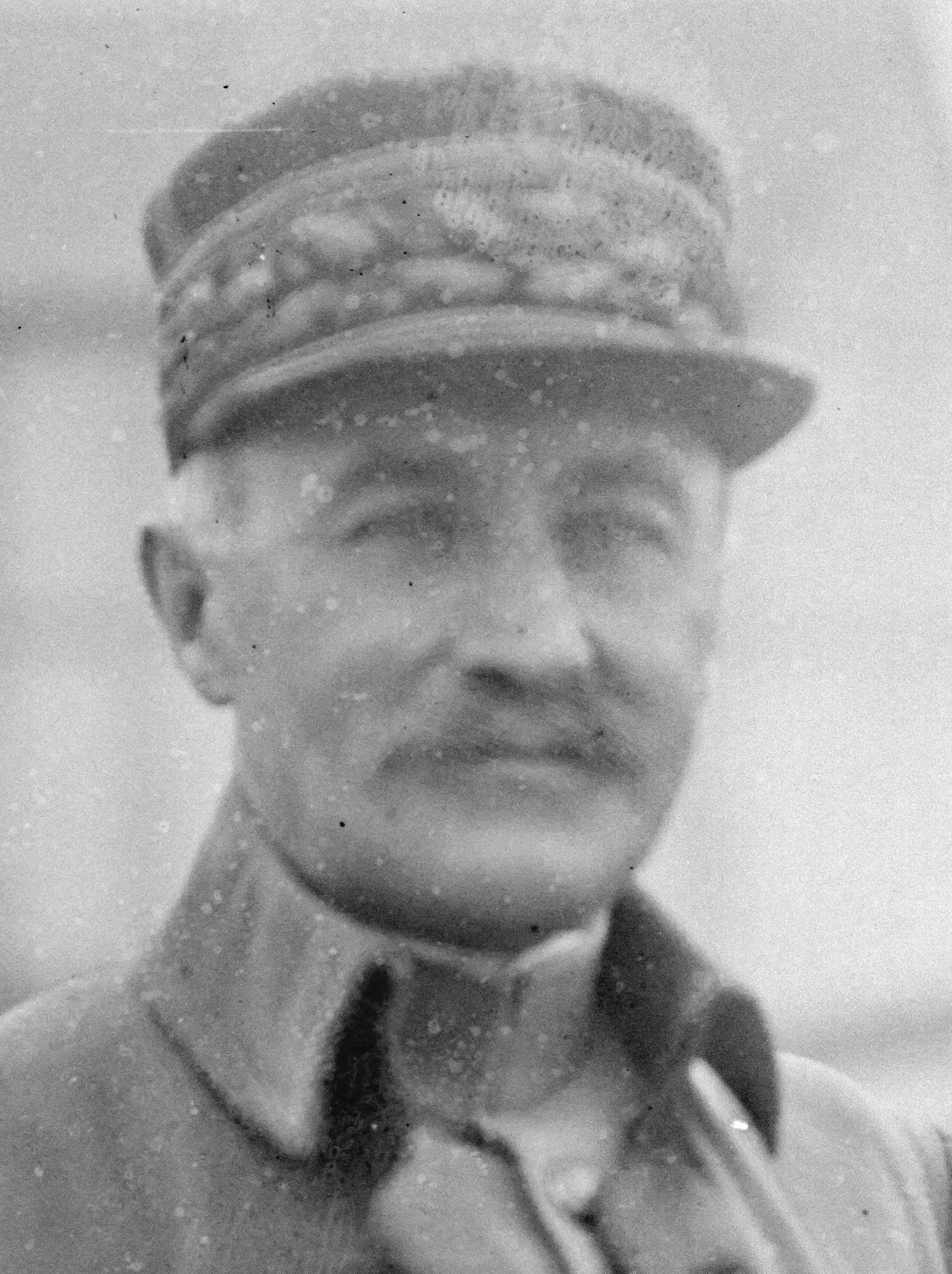
- Born: October 12, 1864; Cherbourg-en-Cotentin, France
- Died: March 17, 1926 (aged 61); Paris
- Burial place: Invalides
- Children: Guy
- Relatives: Admiral Philippe Baucheron de Boissoudy
- Military career
- Allegiance: France
- Rank: General
- Unit: XXI Army Corps
- Commands: 43rd Infantry Division
- Conflicts: World War I

Antoine Baucheron de Boissoudy (12 October 1864 in Cherbourg-en-Cotentin, France – 17 March 1926 in Paris) was a French General in the First World War.

He was the son of Admiral Philippe Baucheron de Boissoudy and studied at the École spéciale militaire de Saint-Cyr and the École supérieure de guerre.

At the start of the First World War, he was Chief of Staff of the XXI Army Corps with which he fought in the Battle of the Frontiers. On 3 March 1915, he became Chief of Staff of the Seventh Army.

On 3 December 1915, he became commander of the 43rd Infantry Division, on 16 October 1916 of the 5th Army Corps and on 4 May 1917 of the Seventh Army. In the last weeks of the war, he received command of the French Army in Belgium with which he fought the Battle of the Lys and the Escaut.

After the War, he commanded the Second Army between 27 November 1918 and 11 February 1919. He was a member of the Conseil supérieur de la Guerre between 30 January 1920 and 5 December 1924. He retired from service in 1924 and died 2 years later. He was buried in the Invalides.

His son Guy (1908-1972) became also a General.

== Sources ==
- This is a translation of an article in the French Wikipedia, Antoine Baucheron de Boissoudy.
