= Third Battle of Artois =

Battle during the First World War

- Part of the Western Front of the First World War
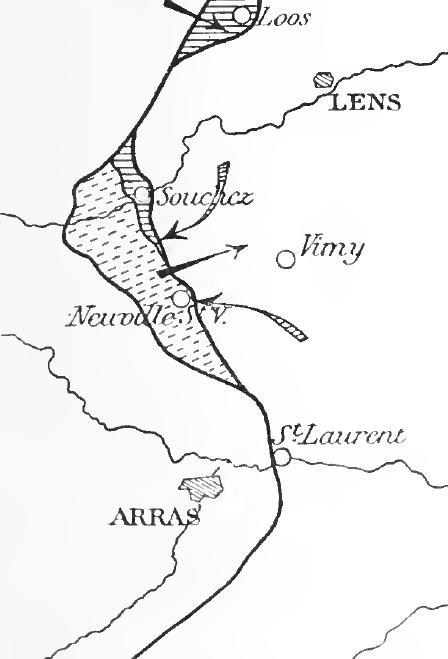
- Franco–British offensive, September 1915
Date	25 September – 4 November 1915
Location	Artois, France 50°30′N 2°45′E
Result	See Analysis section
Territorial changes	Advance of the Entente front line in Artois by 1.2–1.9 mi (2–3 km)

Belligerents
France; United Kingdom	German Empire

Commanders and leaders
(French Third Republic) Victor d'Urbal; (United Kingdom of Great Britain and Ireland) John French	(German Empire) (Kingdom of Bavaria) Crown Prince Rupprecht

Strength
French Tenth Army: 10 divisions; British First Army: 8 divisions	6th Army: 9 divisions

Casualties and losses
French: 48,230; British: 61,713	c. 51,100; (2,000 POW)

The Third Battle of Artois (25 September – 4 November 1915, also the Loos–Artois Offensive) was fought by the French Tenth Army against the German 6th Army on the Western Front of the First World War. The battle included the Battle of Loos by the British First Army. The offensive, meant to complement the Second Battle of Champagne, was the last attempt that year by Joseph Joffre, the French commander-in-chief, to exploit an Allied numerical advantage over Germany. Simultaneous attacks were planned in Champagne-Ardenne to capture the railway at Attigny and in Artois to take the railway line through Douai, to force a German withdrawal from the Noyon salient.

== Background ==
Joffre's plan was a series of attacks along the Western Front, supported by Italian attacks across the Isonzo River and a British Expeditionary Force (BEF) attack near Loos-en-Gohelle. At first, Field Marshal John French and General Sir Douglas Haig opposed the attack, because of the lay of the land, a lack of heavy artillery, ammunition and reserves. The generals were over-ruled by the British minister of war, Lord Kitchener, who ordered French and Haig to conduct the offensive. In Artois, the 6th Army (Crown Prince Rupprecht of Bavaria) faced, in the northern half of its sector up to and Bully Grenay, the British First Army (General Douglas Haig) and in the southern half, the French Tenth Army (General Victor d'Urbal). The French plan aimed to capture the heights between Liévin and Bailleul, followed by a breakthrough and pursuit in the direction of Douai.

== Prelude ==
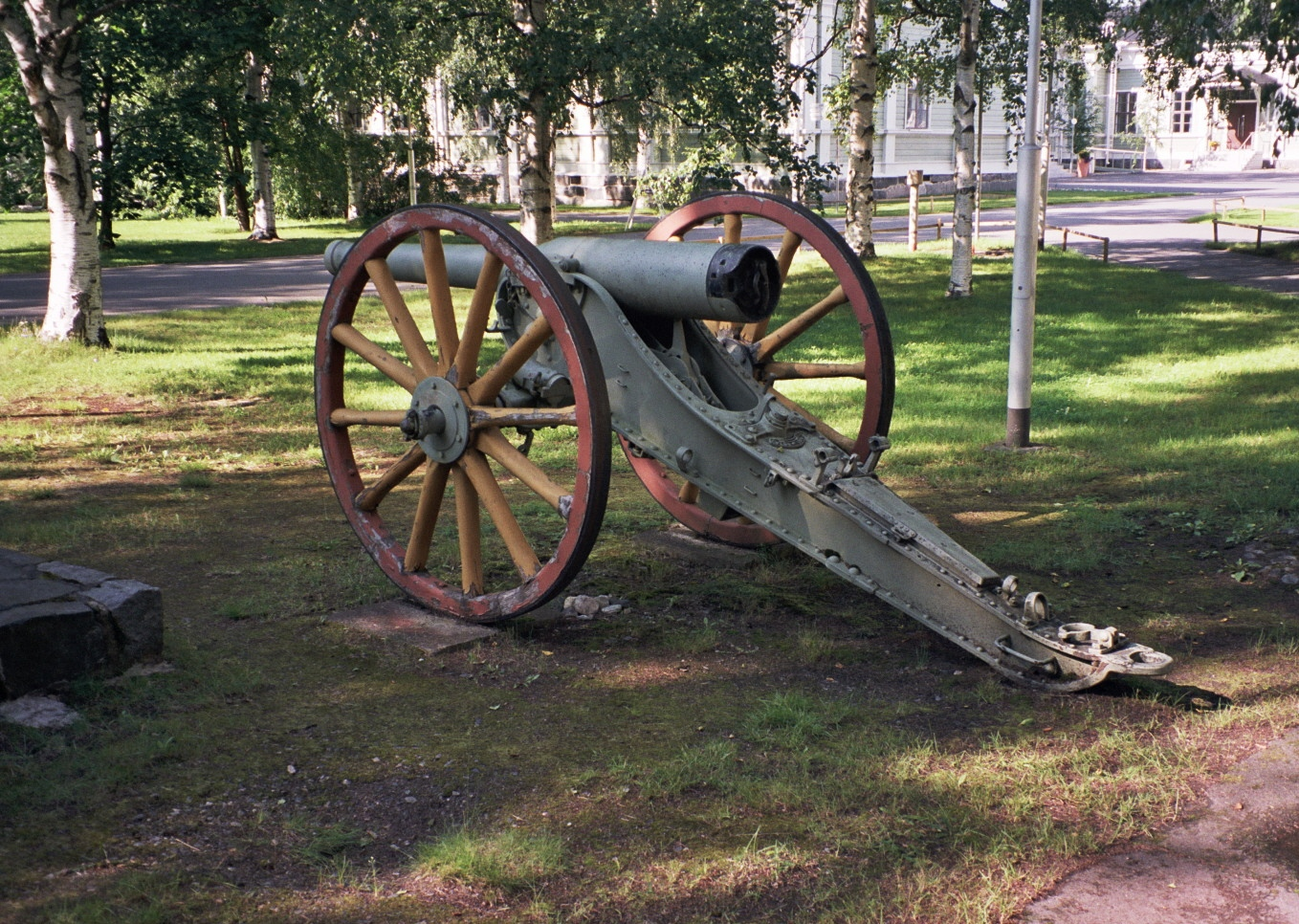
De Bange 90 mm gun

The Tenth Army massed seventeen infantry and two cavalry divisions for the offensive, backed by 630 field guns and 420 heavy artillery pieces. The 6th Army had about thirteen divisions and from 19 to 13 September, the French field artillery fired 1.4 million rounds of ammunition and the heavy artillery 250,000 rounds at the German defences. Obsolete De Bange 90 mm guns were used to fire another 63,500 shells.

== Battle ==
An artillery bombardment began on 21 September, and on 25 September the Tenth Army attacked at 12:25 p.m. to be sure that the morning mist had dispersed. XXI Corps attacked the rest of Souchez village and La Folie farm, XXXIII Corps made some progress but the III and XII corps to the south was repulsed. On the XXI Corps front, the 13th Division, attacking near Souchez with 14,790 men had casualties of 41 per cent in the first few days. During the afternoon it began to rain, impeding artillery observation and attack times were altered to even later in the day, which made co-ordination with the British First Army on the northern flank much more difficult. By 26 September, the XXXIII and XXI corps had taken Souchez but the III and XII corps had made little progress south-east of Neuville-St Vaast.

The French failed to breach the German second line of defence and a breakthrough could not be achieved. Joffre sent the French IX Corps to assist the British attacks at Loos but this action also yielded little of strategic value. Foch was also ordered by Joffre to conserve infantry and ammunition to reinforce the simultaneous offensive in Champagne; ammunition expenditure in Artois had been so vast that the offensive was to be reduced but without giving the British the impression that they were being left in the lurch. In very wet weather, the Tenth Army captured Vimy Ridge, except for the highest point, where German counter-attacks retook the ground from XXXIII Corps. Foch took over ground on the British right flank but it became impossible to co-ordinate attacks for the same day. The Battle continued until 13 October but ended amidst the autumn rains, mutual exhaustion and inter-Allied recriminations.

== Aftermath ==
=== Analysis ===
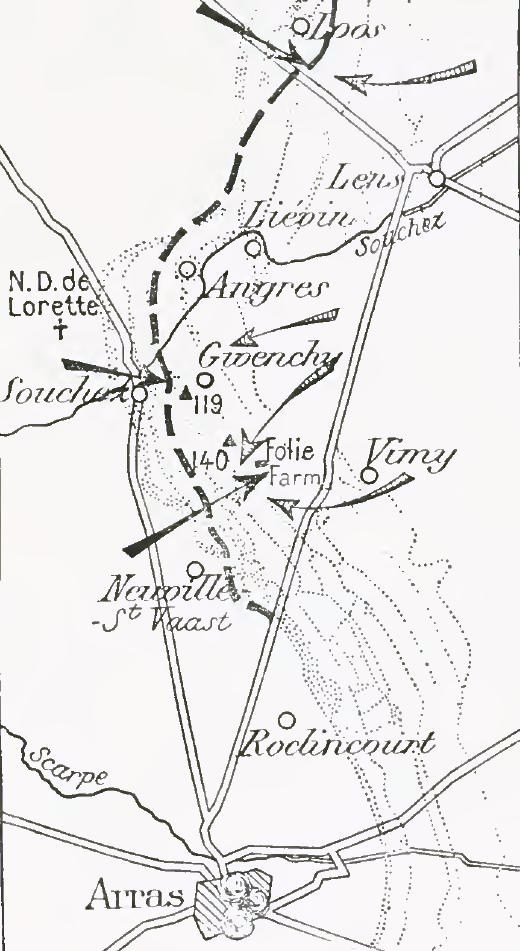
Tenth Army attacks and German counter-attacks, September–October 1915

The two French offensives in Artois in 1915 had advanced the front line by 3.1–3.7 mi (5–6 km) on a 5.6 mi (9 km) front. After advancing 1.9 mi (3 km) in the Second Battle of Artois in May, the French advanced the front line by 1.2–1.9 mi (2–3 km) in the September offensive. Fayolle reported that the Third Battle of Artois had been a failure, because of uncut wire and the firepower of German machine-guns and artillery. The success of infantry attacks was dependent on the ability of the artillery to cut the wire, destroy German field fortifications and prevent the German artillery bombarding French infantry by using counter-battery fire; the simultaneous Second Battle of Champagne continued into October.

=== Casualties ===
The official historians of the Reichsarchiv recorded 51,100 German casualties to the end of October. In 2008, Jack Sheldon used figures taken from the French Official History to record 48,230 casualties, fewer than half of the French casualties suffered in the spring offensive from April to June. James Edmonds, the British official historian, recorded 61,713 British and c. 26,000 German casualties at the Battle of Loos. (Note: The BEF suffered 285,107 casualties in 1915.) Elizabeth Greenhalgh wrote that of the 48,230 French casualties, 18,657 men had been killed or listed as missing, against the capture of 2,000 prisoners, 35 machine-guns, many trench mortars and other items of equipment.
