= 31st Army Corps (France) =

Unit of French army during First World War

The 31st Army Corps (31e corps d'armée) was a corps of the French army, created at the start of the First World War. From the date of its creation until June 1916, the army corps occupied front sectors in Lorraine. In June, the 31st Army Corps fought on the left bank of the Meuse during the Battle of Verdun. Subsequently, it occupied a front line sector in the Argonne, before being transported to the Italian Front as a reinforcement after the Italian defeat at the Battle of Caporetto with the 10th Army. In March 1918, the army corps was redeployed to France, to face the German offensives, it was situated on the Somme front until the end of the war.

== Subordinate units ==
- fr:64e division d'infanterie (France)
- fr:65e division d'infanterie (France)
