= Henri Putz =

French Army general

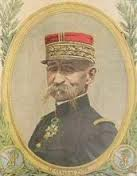
- Henri Putz
- Born: 26 January 1859; Metz, France
- Died: 22 February 1925 (aged 66); Metz, France
- Burial place: Les Invalides, Paris, France
- Military career
- Allegiance: France
- Branch: French Army
- Rank: Général de division
- Commands: 28th Infantry Division; 34th Army Corps; Army Detachment in Belgium; 4th Army Corps; Commandement supérieur du Nord
- Conflicts: Tonkin Campaign; Madagascar expedition; Boxer Rebellion; First World War
- Awards: Grand Officer of the Legion of Honour

Henri Gabriel Putz (26 January 1859 – 22 February 1925) was a French Army general who served during the First World War. He commanded several French formations on the Western Front, including the Army Detachment of the Vosges, the Army Detachment in Belgium and the 4th Army Corps.

== Early life and military career ==
Putz was born in Metz on 26 January 1859. His father, Jean-Baptiste Henry Putz (1824–1903), was a French military officer who attained the rank of brigadier general in 1881 and was appointed a Commander of the Legion of Honour. Following the annexation of Alsace-Lorraine by the German Empire after the Franco-Prussian War, the Putz family opted for French citizenship.

Henri Putz studied at the École Polytechnique, graduating in 1879 ranked sixth in his class. He subsequently chose a career in the artillery.

Putz served in Tunisia during the fighting against Tunisian insurgents in 1881–1882. He later participated in the Tonkin Campaign in Indochina from 1885 to 1887, the Madagascar expedition from 1896 to 1899, and the international military intervention during the Boxer Rebellion in China in 1900–1901.

== First World War ==
At the outbreak of the First World War in 1914, Putz held the rank of divisional general and was appointed commander of the 28th Infantry Division, part of the French First Army under General Auguste Dubail. His division fought in the Battle of the Vosges during August 1914.

On 7 September 1914, Putz was appointed commander of the Groupement des Vosges, a formation subsequently associated with the Army Detachment of the Vosges and the 34th Army Corps.

On 2 April 1915, he took command of the Army Detachment in Belgium, which operated in the northern sector of the Ypres Salient. German forces launched a major gas attack on 22 April, marking the beginning of the Second Battle of Ypres.

From 17 June 1915 to 19 December 1917, Putz commanded the 4th Army Corps. The formation fought in several sectors of the Western Front, including the Argonne, the Aisne and the Somme.

On 23 December 1917, Putz was appointed head of the Commandement supérieur du Nord, a senior French command responsible for operations in the northern sector. He held the position until 19 April 1918.

== Later life ==
After the war, Putz returned to Metz, where he died on 22 February 1925. He was buried at Les Invalides in Paris.

On 20 July 1920, he was appointed a Grand Officer of the Legion of Honour.
