= 7th Army (France) =

The Seventh Army (French: VIIe Armée) was a field army of the French Army during World War I and World War II.

== World War I ==
Created on 4 April 1915 to defend the front between the Swiss border and Lorraine, the Seventh Army was the successor of the independent Army Detachment of the Vosges under General Putz. This Detachment had been created on 8 December 1914, with the stabilisation of the Western Front as successor of the Army of Alsace, Groupement des Vosges and 34th Army Corps.

The Seventh Army held the same position until the end of the War. Its major involvements were the Battle of Hartmannswillerkopf and the Battle of Le Linge in 1915.

== World War II ==
The Seventh Army was re-formed on 3 September 1939 as a strategic reserve force. On 11 November, under General Henri Giraud, it became part of the 1st Army Group and was deployed to northern Belgium, under the Allied Dyle Plan. Following the German offensives in Western Europe from 10 May 1940, the Seventh Army advanced into the Netherlands and northern Belgium under orders to join forces with Dutch troops. After heavy fighting in Belgium and German breakthroughs further south (the Ardennes and Flanders), the general staff ordered the withdrawal of the Seventh Army headquarters (to central France). However, Giraud remained in Belgium to command the French 9th Army, which had assumed control of the surviving 7th Army units. Giraud was captured soon afterward at Wassigny (19 May).

On 17 May, a new Seventh Army had been formed on the Somme, under the 2nd Army Group, with reserve units and surviving units of the Second Army (which had been destroyed in Flanders). The new Seventh Army took an active part in the Battle of France until 25 June, 1940.

== Commanders ==
=== World War I ===
- General Putz (8 December 1914 - 2 April 1915) (Army Detachment of the Vosges)
- General de Maud’huy (2 April 1915 - 3 November 1915)
- General de Villaret (3 November 1915 - 19 December 1916)
- General Debeney (19 December 1916 - 4 April 1917)
- General Baucheron de Boissoudy (4 April 1917 - 15 October 1918)
- General Humbert (15 October 1918 - 23 October 1918)
- General de Mitry (23 October 1918 – Armistice)

=== World War II ===
- General Henri Giraud (2 September 1939 – 19 May 1940)
- General André Corap (19 May 1940)
- General Aubert Frère (19 May 1940 - 1 July 1940)

== See also ==
- List of French armies in World War I
