= Victor d'Urbal =

French military officer

- Born: 15 November 1858
- Died: 29 January 1943 (aged 84)

Victor (Louis Lucien), baron d'Urbal (15 November 1858, in Sarreguemines – 29 January 1943, in Paris) was a French officer during the First World War.

== Life ==
He entered the École spéciale militaire de Saint-Cyr on 15 November 1876 and left it in 1878, moving to the École d’application de cavalerie at Saumur. He saw action in Algeria from 17 January 1889 to 31 December 1890.

In 1906 he was put in command of a cavalry regiment and on 24 June 1911 of 4th Dragoon Brigade, with whom he set off at the start of the First World War in August 1914. He was next put in command of 7th Cavalry Division on 25 August that year but was quickly promoted to head 33rd Army Corps on 20 September. A month later, on 20 October, he was put in command of all French troops in Belgium, then on 16 November of 8th Army. He commanded 8th Army until 2 April 1915, when he was transferred to command 10th Army, which he led during the Battle of La Bassée from 10 October – 2 November 1914, the Second Battle of Artois ( May–July 1915) and the Third Battle of Artois from September–October 1915.

He was retired from active service on 4 April 1916 and made inspector-general of the cavalry in the army zones on 8 April the same year. He was made inspector-general of the cavalry depots in the army zones and the interior on 28 February, a post he held until 1 June 1919, when he was fully retired, shifting to the reserves on 15 November 1920. He is buried at the Hôtel des Invalides.

== Ranks ==
- Sous-lieutenant (15 October 1879)
- Lieutenant (11 June 1882)
- Capitaine (10 December 1887)
- Chef d’escadrons (25 May 1897)
- Lieutenant colonel (12 July 1908)
- Colonel (22 December 1906)
- Général de brigade (20 June 1911)
- Général de division (30 August 1914)
