= Georges Louis Humbert =

French general

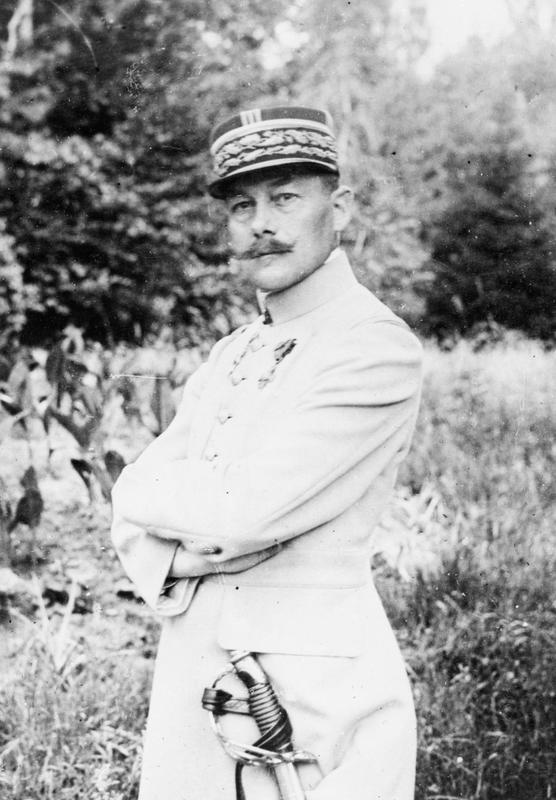
- Humbert in Verberie, c. July 1916
- Born: 8 April 1862; Gazeran, Île-de-France
- Died: 1921; France
- Military career
- Allegiance: France
- Service years: 1875–1918
- Rank: General
- Commands: Eighth Army; Third Army; Seventh Army
- Conflicts: French colonial wars World War I: First Battle of the Marne; First Battle of Ypres; Second Battle of the Aisne

Georges Louis Humbert (French pronunciation: [ʒɔʁʒ lwi ɛ̃bɛʁ]; 8 April 1862 – 1921) was a French general during World War I.

He was the son of Émile Siméon Humbert, a gendarme and Nathalie Augustine Eulalie Breton.

== Career ==
He participated in the Tonkin Campaign (1885–1887), the Second Madagascar expedition (1895–1896) and the Tunisia Expedition of 1906.
On 23 June 1907, he became Colonel of the 96th Infantry Regiment and on 23 March 1912 General of the 56th Infantry Brigade.

In World War I, he led the Division marocaine during the Battle of the Marshes of Saint-Gond, as part of the First Battle of the Marne (September 1914). Between 21 September 1914 and 9 March 1915, he was in command of the Groupement Humbert, later named Corps combiné Humbert, which became the 32nd Army Corps.

On 9 March 1915, he received the command of the Eighth Army until 24 July of the same year, when he took over the command over the six divisions of the Third Army, which he held until the Armistice. General Humbert played a key role for General Pétain in sealing the breach on the Western Front during the German spring offensive.

He also briefly commanded the Seventh Army, in 15–23 October 1918.

Humbert was one of the most appreciated French generals of World War I. His son Jacques followed in his footsteps and was a general during World War II.

Humbert died from complications of malaria in 1921. He was buried in the vaults of Les Invalides.

== See also ==
- Moroccan Division
