= 1st Army (France) =

1^{re} Armée
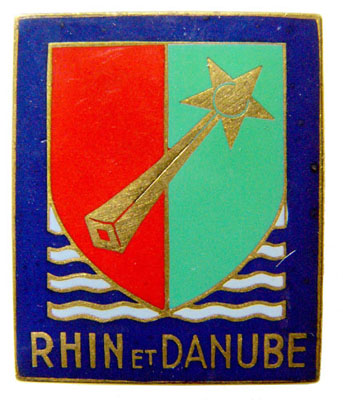
- Insignia of First French Army during World War II
- Active: 1914–1918; 1939–1940; 1944–1945; 1970–1996
- Country: France
- Branch: French Army
- Type: Field army
- Part of: French First Army Group (Groupe d'Armées no. 1)
- Mottos: Rhin et Danube (English: Rhine and Danube)
- Engagements: World War I World War II

Commanders
- Notable commanders: General Georges Blanchard (Sept 1939 – May 1940)

The First Army (French: 1^{re} Armée) was a field army of France that fought during World War I and World War II. Re-formed in 1970, the 1st Army was active for the remainder Cold War, and disbanded in 1996.

== World War I ==
On mobilization in August 1914, General Auguste Dubail was put in the charge of the First Army, which comprised the 7th, 8th, 13th, 14th, and 21st Army Corps, two divisions of cavalry and one reserve infantry division. It was massed between Belfort and the general line Mirecourt-Lunéville with headquarters at Epinal. First Army then took part, along with the French Second Army, in the Invasion of Lorraine. The First Army intended to take the strongly defended town of Sarrebourg. Bavarian Crown Prince Rupprecht, commander of the German Sixth Army, was tasked with stopping the French invasion. The French attack was repulsed by Rupprecht and his stratagem of pretending to retreat and then strongly attacking back. On 20 August Rupprecht launched a major counter-offensive, driving the French armies out. Dubail was replaced in 1915. A frantic 1916 saw four different commanders command the First Army; an even more frantic 1917 saw five different commanders at the helm (including François Anthoine during the Battle of Passchendaele). By the time of Passchendaele, the French First Army was composed of two corps – the 1st Army Corps (composed of 4 divisions) and the 36th Army Corps (composed of 2 divisions).

== World War II ==
=== 1940 ===
During World War II the French First Army, under the command of General Georges Blanchard, formed part of the forces ranged against the German Army during the Battle of France. It formed part of Groupe d'Armees no. 1 (Army Group No. 1), itself part of the Théatre d'Operations Nord-Est. On 10 May 1940, it included the Cavalry Corps, and the 3rd, 4th, and 5th Army Corps, as well as the 1re Division Cuirassée (1st DCR, effectively an armoured division with four battalions of tanks and one of infantry, plus supporting units) and 32nd Infantry Division. When the Wehrmacht invaded France and the Low Countries in 1940, the First Army was one of the many armies including the British Expeditionary Force (BEF) that advanced north to stop the German armies.

On 21 May 1940 the First Army was one of the armies trapped in a vast pocket with their backs to the sea that would eventually result in the Dunkirk evacuations. As the Germans moved in, what remained of the once-formidable First Army was hopelessly surrounded at Lille but counterattacked and resisted fiercely in a delaying action aiming to buy time for the beleaguered Anglo-French defenders of Dunkirk. General Jean-Baptiste Molinié's 40,000 remaining men engaged seven German divisions (including the 4th, 5th, and 7th Panzer Divisions, roughly 110,000 men and 800 tanks), capturing General Fritz Kuhne of the 253rd Infantry Division (Wehrmacht) in the fighting and halting the German capture of Dunkirk for three days. It is estimated that the First Army's last battle allowed the evacuation of an additional 100,000 men from Dunkirk.

The First Army formally ceased to exist on 29 May, though a portion escaped with the British soldiers.

=== 1944–1945 ===
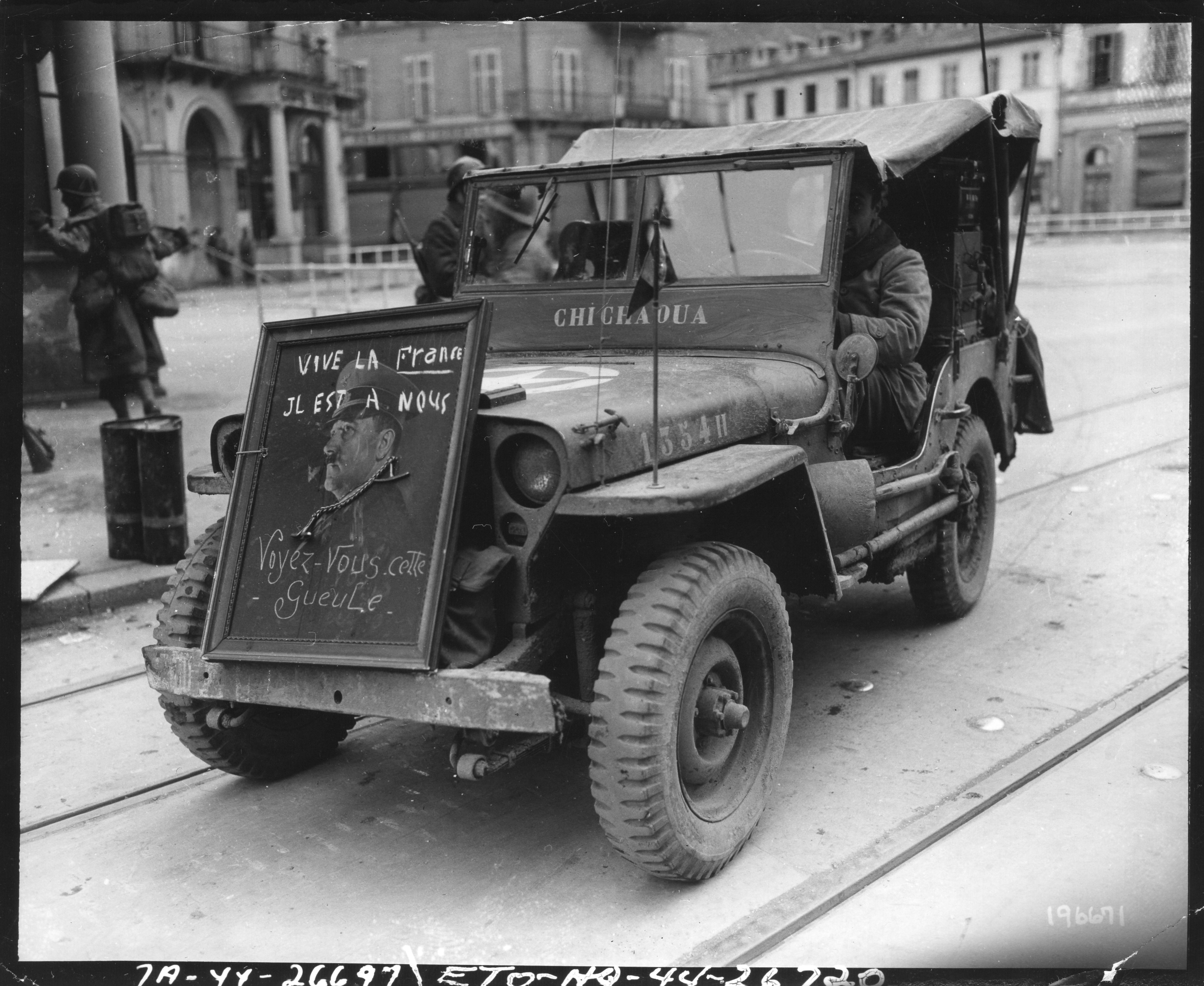
Members of the 1st French Army, in the Mulhouse area, France, decorated this jeep with a captured picture of Hitler: 21 November 1944

The First Army was reconstituted as French Army B under the command of General Jean de Lattre de Tassigny in the summer of 1944. It landed in southern France after Operation Dragoon, the Allied invasion of the area. On 25 September 1944, French Army B was redesignated French First Army. Liberating Marseille, Toulon, and Lyon, it later formed the right flank of the Allied Southern Group of Armies (also known as the U.S. Sixth Army Group) at the southern end of the Allied front line, adjacent to Switzerland. It commanded two corps, the French I and II Corps. The French First Army liberated the southern area of the Vosges Mountains, including Belfort. Its operations in the area of Burnhaupt destroyed the German IV Luftwaffe Korps in November 1944. In January 1945 it defended against operation Nordwind, the last major German offensive on the western front. In February 1945, with the assistance of the U.S. XXI Corps, the First Army collapsed the Colmar Pocket and cleared the west bank of the river Rhine of Germans in the area south of Strasbourg. In March 1945, the First Army fought through the Siegfried Line fortifications in the Bienwald Forest near Lauterbourg. Subsequently, the First Army crossed the Rhine near Speyer and captured Karlsruhe and Stuttgart. Operations by the First Army in April 1945 encircled and captured the German XVIII S.S. Armee Korps in the Black Forest and cleared southwestern Germany. At the end of the war, the motto of the French First Army was Rhin et Danube, referring to the two great German rivers that it had reached and crossed during its combat operations.

==== Composition ====
The First Army was mainly composed of North African troops (Maghrebis, French pieds-noirs and a significant number of escapees from occupied France) drawn from the Army of Africa.
These troops had played a major role in the liberation of Corsica (September–October 1943) and the Italian Campaign (1943–1944), with about 130,000 men engaged. During the French and German campaigns of 1944-45, these troops formed the core of the First Army. In Autumn 1944, First Army comprised about 250,000 men, half of them Indigenes (Mahgrebian and Black African) and half Europeans from North Africa. From September 1944 onward, 114,000 men of the French Forces of the Interior were added to the First Army, replacing many African troops. Eventually, more than 320,000 men would form the First Army during its final advances in Germany and Austria.

- 1st Free French Division (1st DFL, later became the 1st Motorized Infantry Division and finally the 1st March Infantry Division)
- 2nd Armoured Division (2nd DB, former 2nd Light Division) only for a short time in late 1944
- 2nd Moroccan Infantry Division (2nd DIM)
- 3rd Algerian Infantry Division (3rd DIA)
- 4th Moroccan Mountain Division (4th DMM)
- 9th Colonial Infantry Division (9th DIC)
- 1st Armoured Division (1st DB)
- 5th Armoured Division (5th DB)
- Moroccan Goums (Four groups of Tabors, equivalent to one brigade)
- 10th Infantry Division (Colmar Pocket only)
- 14th Infantry Division (Germany and Austria campaigns)

From 26 September 1944, André Malraux's Alsace-Lorraine Independent Brigade, formed from the FFI, formed part of the army's reserves. Like other units formed from FFI personnel, Malraux's brigade was subsequently incorporated into the French Army as a regular unit (and was retitled the 3rd Demi-Brigade of Chasseurs).

== Cold War ==
During the Cold War the First Army was again active. Army headquarters was at Strasbourg, and may have also been at Metz for a period. For a time the army commander was also the Military Governor of Strasbourg (see Hôtel des Deux-Ponts).

Among army commanders were Generals Emmanuel Hublot (1969–72), André Biard (1977–79) and Claude Vanbremeersch (1979–80).

In 1970 the Army appears to have controlled I Corps (HQ Nancy, France) with the 4th Armoured Division with its headquarters at Verdun, the 7th Infantry Division with headquarters at Mulhouse, and the 8th Armoured Division with its headquarters at Compiègne (2nd, 4th, and 14th Brigades). II Corps was at Koblenz with the 1st Armoured Division at Treves (Trier) (1st, 3rd, and 11th Brigades), and the 3rd Division at Freiburg (5th, 12th, and 13th Brigades).

The Army controlled the I Corps, the II Corps, and the III Corps as well as Army troops, including Pluton artillery, and three anti-aircraft artillery regiments, the 401st, 402nd, and 403rd Regiments d'Artillerie, during the 1980s. Signals units included the 40th, 44th, and 54th Regiments de transmissions. After deactivation as the war headquarters for the NATO Central Army Group, Ouvrage Rochonvillers was designated as the First Army's war headquarters in the 1980s.

In 1990 the army staff left Strasbourg and moved to the Château de Mercy in Mercy-lès-Metz, Moselle.

The army's last commander was General Jean Cot. The 1st Army was disbanded on 31 August 1993.

== Commanders ==
=== World War I ===
- General Auguste Dubail (Mobilisation – 5 January 1915)
- General Pierre Roques (5 January 1915 – 25 March 1916)
- General Olivier Mazel (25–31 March 1916)
- General Augustin Gérard (31 March – 31 December 1916)
- General Emile Fayolle (31 December 1916 – 6 May 1917)
- General Joseph Alfred Micheler (6 May – 1 June 1917)
- General Henri Gouraud (1–15 June 1917)
- General François Anthoine (15 June – 21 December 1917)
- General Marie-Eugène Debeney (21 December 1917 – Armistice)

=== World War II ===
- General Georges Blanchard (2 September 1939 – 26 May 1940)
- General René Prioux (26–29 May 1940)
- General Jean de Lattre de Tassigny (September 1944 – 1 August 1945)

== See also ==
- List of French armies in World War I
