= 8th Army (France) =

Eighth Army
- Country: France
- Branch: French Army
- Size: Army
- Engagements: First World War; Occupation of the Rhineland; Second World War

Commanders
- Notable commanders: Victor d'Urbal; Marcel Garchery

The Eighth Army (French: VIIIe Armée) was a Field army of the French Army during World War I and World War II.

During World War I, there were two 8th armies. The first was in existence under the command of General Victor d'Urbal until April 1915 when 9th Army Corps and 9th Army Corps were joined to 10th Army, which d'Urbal assumed command of for the Second Battle of Artois. The remainder of 8th Army was then renamed as the Détachement d'armée de Belgique.

The 8th Army was reformed from the former Détachement d'armée de Lorraine (Army Detachment of Lorraine) and operated on the Western Front between 2 January 1917 and 11 November 1918. After the armistice at the end of World War I, it was part of the occupation of the Rhineland. On 21 October 1919 it was combined with the Tenth Army to form the French Army of the Rhine.

During World War II and the Battle of France, it was part of Army Group 3 along the Maginot Line.

== Commanders ==
=== World War I ===
- General Victor d'Urbal (20 October 1914 – 2 April 1915)
- General Putz (2 April – 22 May 1915) (Army Detachment in Belgium)
- General Humbert (9 March – 24 July 1915) (Army Detachment of Lorraine)
- General Gérard (24 July – 5 November 1915) (Army Detachment of Lorraine)
- General Deprez (5 November 1915 – 31 December 1916) (Army Detachment of Lorraine)
- General Gérard (31 December 1916 – 21 October 1919)

=== World War II ===
- General Marcel Garchery (2 September 1939 – 21 May 1940)
- General Emile Laure (21 May – 23 June 1940)

== See also ==
- List of French armies in WWI
