= 10th Army (France) =

Field army of the French Army during World War I and World War II

The Tenth Army (French: Xe Armée) was a Field army of the French Army during World War I and World War II.

== World War I ==
The Tenth Army, first called détachement d'armée Maud'huy, was formed on 1 October 1914 during the Race to the Sea.

It gained a victory in the Battle of Arras (1914). Later, it took part in the Second Battle of Artois (May 1915), the Third Battle of Artois (September 1915), the Battle of the Somme (July 1916), and the Second Battle of the Aisne (April 1917).

In October 1917, at the request of the Italian Supreme Commander, General Luigi Cadorna, the Tenth Army moved onto the Italian Front alongside British Expeditionary Force units, together forming the Italian Expeditionary Force. For this operation the army included the 12th Army Corps and the 31st Army Corps, for a total of six infantry divisions of French troops. The Italians had been pushed back at the Battle of Caporetto by German Army reinforced Austro-Hungarian divisions. French forces were settled mostly west of the city of Verona, supposedly to counter a rumoured offensive by Austro-Hungarian forces that would purportedly come from the County of Tyrol via the Adige river valley.

On 26 March 1918, the Tenth Army returned to France, where it fought in the Third Battle of the Aisne, Second Battle of the Marne and the Hundred Days Offensive.
The two divisions of 12th Army Corps under command of Jean César Graziani remained in Italy until the end of the war.

== Interwar Period ==
After the Armistice it was part of the occupation of the Rhineland. On 21 October 1919 it was combined with the Eighth Army to form the French Army of the Rhine.

== World War II ==
It was reformed in the Second World War. A first Tenth Army is disbanded between 7 and 8 June 1940, with on the one hand the encirclement of the 9th Army Corps at Saint-Valéry-en-Caux and on the other hand the attachment of the 10th and 25th Army Corps to the Armée de Paris. After the rupture of the Somme front, on 5 et 6 June 1940, the last phase of the Battle of France began. For the Allies it was essential to regroup on the Seine River to prevent the Germans from crossing. This is why a new 10th Army was formed to hold the front at the Lower Seine and placed under command of General Robert Altmayer (1875 - 1959). His troops were not yet in place when the Germans appeared at the Seine on 9 June and immediately crossed it in the Portejoie, Saint-Pierre-du-Vauvray and Venables sector. The Weygand Line had been broken.

== Commanders ==
=== World War I ===
- General de Maudhuy (3 October 1914 – 2 April 1915)
- General d'Urbal (2 April 1915 – 4 April 1916)
- General Micheler (4 April – 27 December 1916)
- General Duchene (27 December 1916 – 11 December 1917)
- General Maistre (11 December 1917 – 10 June 1918)
- General Charles Mangin (10 June 1918 – 21 October 1919)

=== World War II ===
- General Robert Altmayer (24 May – 19 June 1940)

== See also ==
List of French armies in WWI
