= 2nd Army (France) =

1914–1940 field army of the French Army

The Second Army (French: IIe Armée) was a field army of the French Army during World War I and World War II. The Army became famous for fighting the Battle of Verdun in 1916 under Generals Philippe Pétain and Robert Nivelle.

== Commanders ==
=== World War I ===
- General de Curières de Castelnau (Mobilization – 21 June 1915)
- General Pétain (21 June 1915 – 1 May 1916)
- General Nivelle (1 May 1916 – 15 December 1916)
- General Guillaumat (15 December 1916 – 11 December 1917)
- General Auguste Edouard Hirschauer (11 December 1917 – 22 December 1918)
- General Antoine Baucheron de Boissoudy (22 December 1918 – 11 February 1919)

=== World War II ===
- General Charles Huntziger (2 September 1939 – 5 June 1940)
- General Henry Freydenberg (5 June – 31 July 1940)

== History ==
=== 1918 ===
On the 25th of September, the American First Army relieved the French Second Army from the sector between Meuse and the Argonne Forest.

== See also ==
- List of French armies in WWI
