= Joseph Joffre =

French general (1852–1931)

Généralissime Marshal Joseph Joffre LH OM GCB
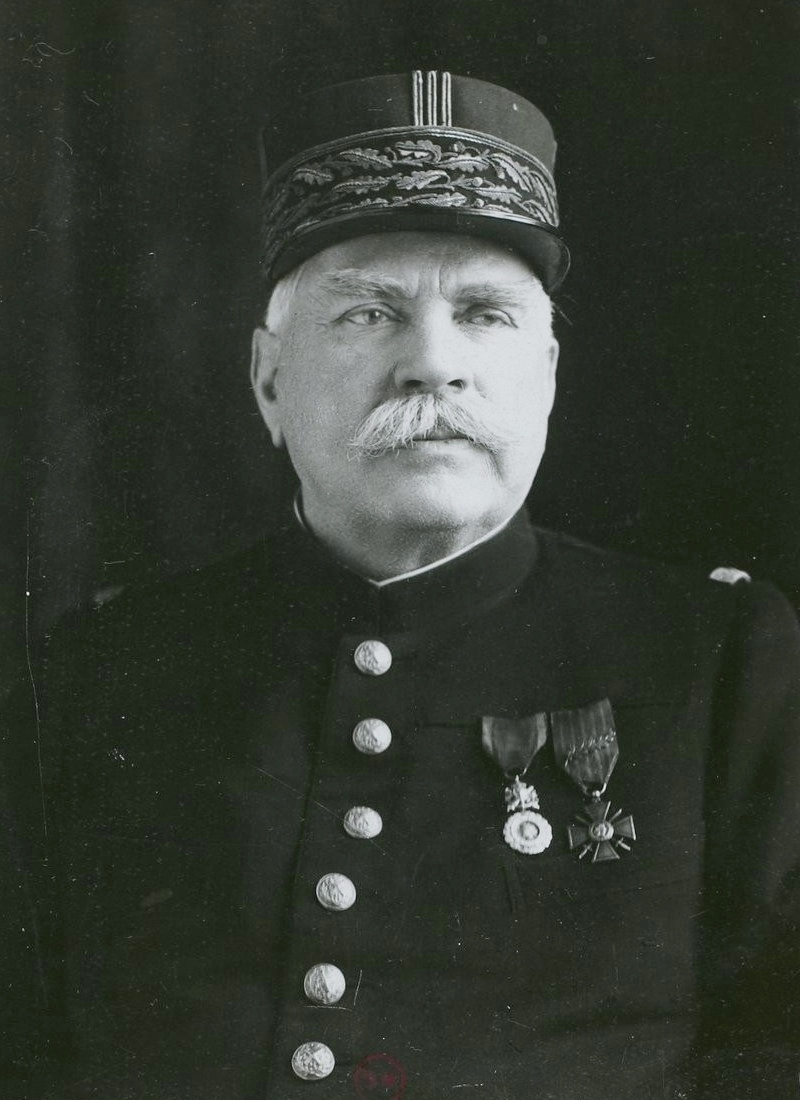
- Marshal Joffre, unknown date after 1916

23rd Chief of the Army Staff of France
- In office 29 July 1911 – 14 December 1916
- President: Armand Fallières; Raymond Poincaré
- Prime Minister: Joseph Caillaux; Raymond Poincaré; Aristide Briand; Louis Barthou; Gaston Doumergue; Alexandre Ribot; Rene Viviani
- Minister of War: Adolphe Messimy; Alexandre Millerand; Albert Lebrun; Eugène Étienne; Joseph Noulens; Théophile Delcassé; Joseph Gallieni; Pierre Roques; Hubert Lyautey
- Preceded by: Augustin Dubail
- Succeeded by: Robert Nivelle

1st Commander of the Grand Quartier Général
- In office 2 August 1914 – 27 December 1916
- President: Raymond Poincaré
- Minister of War: Adolphe Messimy; Alexandre Millerand; Joseph Gallieni; Pierre Roques; Hubert Lyautey
- Chief of Staff: Himself; Robert Nivelle
- Preceded by: GDG created
- Succeeded by: Robert Nivelle

24th Commander of the 2nd Army Corps
- In office 31 May 1908 – 23 February 1910
- President: Armand Fallières
- Minister of War: Maurice Berteaux; Eugène Étienne; Georges Picquart; Jean Brun
- Chief of Staff: Jean Brun; Édouard Laffon de Ladebat
- Preceded by: Victor-Constant Michel
- Succeeded by: Georges Picquart

15th Commander of the 6th Infantry Division
- In office 13 January 1906 – 31 May 1908
- President: Émile Loubet; Armand Fallières
- Minister of War: Eugène Étienne; Georges Picquart
- Chief of Staff: Jean Brun
- Preceded by: François Ferdinand Virgile Malafosse
- Succeeded by: François Louis Auguste Goiran

Personal details
- Born: 12 January 1852 Rivesaltes, France
- Died: 3 January 1931 (aged 78) Paris, France
- Spouses: Amélie Pourcheyroux (m. 1873; died 1874) Henriette Penon (m. 1905)
- Parents: Gilles Joseph Félix Joffre (father); Catherine Plas (mother)
- Education: École Polytechnique
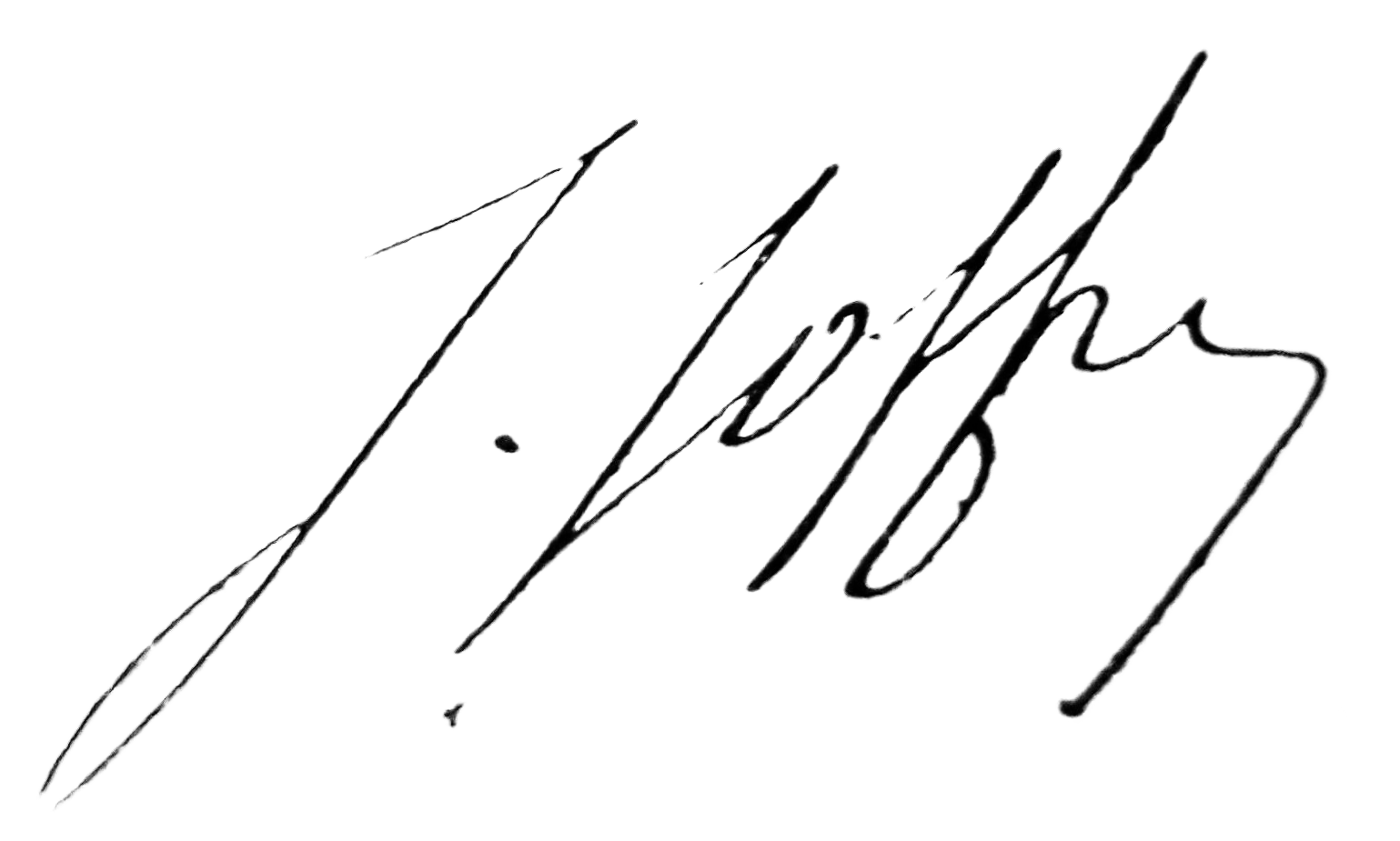
- Signature

Military service
- Allegiance: (French Third Republic) Second Empire (French Third Republic) Third Republic
- Branch/service: French Army: Cavalry
- Years of service: 1869–1916
- Rank: Generalissimo
- Commands: List: 19th Artillery Brigade; 6th Infantry Division; 2nd Corps
- Battles/wars: List: Franco-Prussian War; Siege of Paris; Sino-French War; First World War; Battle of the Frontiers; First Battle of the Marne; Race to the Sea; First Battle of Artois; First Battle of Champagne; Second Battle of Ypres; Second Battle of Artois; Second Battle of Champagne; Battle of Verdun; Battle of the Somme

Joseph Jacques Césaire Joffre (French: [ʒozɛf ʒɔfʁ]; 12 January 1852 – 3 January 1931) was a French general who served as Commander-in-Chief of French forces on the Western Front from the start of World War I until the end of 1916. He is best known for regrouping the retreating allied armies to defeat the Germans at the strategically decisive First Battle of the Marne in September 1914.

His political position waned after unsuccessful offensives in 1915, the German attack on Verdun in 1916, and the disappointing results of the Anglo-French offensive on the Somme in 1916. At the end of 1916 he was promoted to Marshal of France, the first such elevation under the Third Republic, and moved to an advisory role, from which he quickly resigned. Later in the war he led an important mission to the United States.

== Early career ==
Joffre was born in Rivesaltes, Pyrénées-Orientales, into a family of vineyard owners. At a young age, he was a studious student, excelling at mathematics, descriptive geometry, and drawing. In 1870, he entered the École Polytechnique and became a career officer. He first saw active service as a junior artillery officer during the Siege of Paris in the Franco-Prussian War. After the war he underwent further training at the École Polytechnique before transferring to the génie (engineers). Joffre subsequently spent much of his career in the colonies as a military engineer, serving with distinction in the Keelung campaign during the Sino-French War (August 1884 – April 1885). As a major, he led a column from Ségou to Timbuktu in Mali, where he recovered the remains of Lt. Col. Bonnier, who had been killed on a recent expedition. His mission killed over a hundred Tuareg and captured fifteen hundred cattle. He was promoted as a result. He served under Joseph Gallieni in Madagascar and was promoted to Général de brigade while serving there.

After returning to France in 1903 to command the 19th Cavalry Brigade, he then moved to the War Ministry in Paris as Director of Engineers in 1904. The next year he was promoted to Général de division, the highest rank in the French Army at the time. Subsequently, he commanded the 6th Infantry Division and served as Inspector of Military Schools. Joffre commanded the 2nd Army Corps from 1908 until 1910 when he was appointed to the Conseil supérieur de la guerre.

The Minister of War Adolphe Messimy reorganized the high command of the French Army in July 1911. General Victor-Constant Michel, the Vice President of the Conseil supérieur de la guerre and Commander-in-Chief designate, was sacked after proposing a defensive strategy in the event of war with Germany. Messimy took the opportunity to merge the office of vice president with the Chief of the General Staff and create a single professional head of the Army. The newly enhanced post was first offered to Gallieni and Paul Pau, who both declined, leading to Joffre's appointment.

With the revival of the army and a purge of "defensive-minded" officers, he adopted the strategy devised by Ferdinand Foch, the deployment plan known as Plan XVII. He was selected to command despite never having commanded an Army, even on paper, and "having no knowledge whatever of General Staff work." After a left-wing government came to power in 1914, he was due to be replaced by socialist-leaning Maurice Sarrail in the autumn, but war broke out before this could take place.

== World War I ==
=== 1914 ===
==== Battle of the Frontiers ====
At the outbreak of war, the French plan clashed with the German Schlieffen Plan, much to the detriment of the French. On 15 August, after German cavalry had been spotted at Dinant on the Meuse, and after repeated warnings from Charles Lanrezac of the Fifth Army, Joffre issued his Instruction Particuliere No 10, stating that the main German effort would come through Belgium.

Although Joffre was aware (8am on 18 August) that as many as fifteen German corps were moving through Belgium (in fact it was sixteen, and twenty-eight if the German Fourth and Fifth Armies are also included), he believed that only a few of these would come west of the Meuse, where he believed they could be held by the British and Belgians. The French Third and Fourth Armies were preparing to attack into the Ardennes, and he wanted Lanrezac's Fifth Army to attack the bulk of the German right wing on its west flank as – it was assumed – it attacked the left flank of the French Fourth Army.

The French First and Second Armies attacked into Alsace-Lorraine on 19 and 20 August and were beaten back with severe loss by German forces, which were preparing for a counteroffensive. Joffre believed (20 August) that Liège was still holding out (in fact the last of the Liège forts had fallen on 16 August), and hoped that Lanrezac would be able to reach Namur, which was expected to hold out for even longer. The Germans entered Brussels that day, but Joffre was convinced, after the defeat in Alsace-Lorraine and air and cavalry reports of strong German forces in Belgium, that the German centre in the Ardennes must be weak. On 21 August the French Second Army was pressed by a German counterattack. Édouard de Castelnau asked for permission to abandon Nancy and its fortified heights, but Joffre forbade him to do so.

With the French Third and Fourth Armies now attacking into the Ardennes, and the infantry outpacing their horsedrawn artillery, von Bülow's German Second Army attacked Lanrezac and forced bridgeheads across the Meuse. The Fifth Army was also now attacked on its right by Max von Hausen's German Third Army; although these attacks were held, Lanrezac asked Joffre for permission to retreat. On 23 August the Fifth Army was attacked again.

On 23 August Joffre reported to Adolphe Messimy, the French war minister, that his Fourth Army was pressing into the Ardennes with (he believed, wrongly) local numerical superiority, despite the fact that he had already received reports of French defeats in this sector on previous days. The German Fourth and Fifth Armies were in fact advancing against the French forces in front of them rather than moving westwards as Joffre believed. In his memoirs Joffre later admitted that he had been mistaken (he was also unaware of the fall of Namur and of the extent of the fighting at Mons and Charleroi on his left), but at the time he demanded that the French Fourth Army resume the offensive and provide lists of unsatisfactory officers for dismissal. Messimy fully supported Joffre in his purge of unsuccessful generals, even suggesting that, as in 1793, some of them simply ought to be executed.

==== Retreat ====
On 25 August, rejecting the advice of his staff officer General Berthelot that Lanrezac be ordered to attack westwards against the inside of the German right wing, he instead had Major Maurice Gamelin draw up plans for a French concentration at Amiens, with many of the troops drawn from the French right wing in Alsace, and with regret also ordered the successful counterattacks of the Third Army and the Army of Lorraine be called off. Michel-Joseph Maunoury was put in command of the newly formed Sixth Army, which initially assembled near Amiens and then fell back toward Paris (26 August).

Concerned at reports (which later turned out to be exaggerated) that the British had been defeated at Le Cateau and would need French protection to recover cohesion, early on 27 August Joffre gave Lanrezac a direct written order to counterattack as soon as his forces were on open ground, where they could use their artillery, which Lanrezac had told him was the key factor. After Lanrezac spent the day arguing against the order, Joffre visited him at 8:30 am on 28 August and ordered him to attack to the west. After a "heated" discussion, Joffre had Gamelin draw up a written order and signed it in Lanrezac's presence.

Fernand de Langle de Cary's Fourth Army, originally intended to be the spearhead of the attack into the Ardennes, was a strong force and had made several counterattacks, but Joffre now ordered it to cease counterattacking and to send a detachment under Ferdinand Foch to cover the gap between Fourth and Fifth Armies; this became the new Ninth Army.

Joffre turned up at Lanrezac's headquarters to supervise his conduct of the Battle of Guise (29 August), willing if necessary to sack him there and then. In the event he was impressed by Lanrezac's cool demeanour and handling of the battle. As a result of the battle, Alexander von Kluck's German First Army broke off its attacks on Maunoury's Sixth Army and swung south-east, inside of Paris.

==== The Marne ====
Messimy, the war minister, ordered Joffre to provide three active corps to defend Paris on 25 August, but Joffre, regarding this as interference with strategy, ignored him. On 26 August René Viviani formed a new government (the Union sacrée), and on 27 August the new war minister, Alexandre Millerand, who had replaced Messimy largely because of the poor state of the Paris defences, visited Joffre. The general promised to provide the three corps for Paris if Maunoury's attack near Amiens failed.

On 30 August Joffre recommended that the French government evacuate Paris and learned of the Russian disaster at Tannenberg, although he was aware that two German corps were still headed east as reinforcements for East Prussia. On 1 September the Fifth Army retreated across the Aisne in some confusion, and Joffre issued his Instruction Generale No 4, placing Maunoury's Sixth Army under the command of Joseph Gallieni as military governor of Paris and forming a new cavalry corps under Louis Conneau to fill the gap between the Fifth Army and the British Expeditionary Force (BEF). At this stage his mind was still leaning towards Berthelot's old suggestion that the Fifth Army attack westwards against the inside of the German right wing.

On 2 September, the anniversary of the Battle of Sedan, the government left Paris for Bordeaux. That day Joffre placed Maunoury under Gallieni's direct command as the "Armies of Paris" and had Millerand place Gallieni under his own command. Joffre planned to retreat behind the Seine before counterattacking. He envisaged "a battle", probably to take place around 8 September, "between the horns of Paris and Verdun.". He sacked Lanrezac on the afternoon of 3 September, replacing him with the more aggressive Louis Franchet d'Espèrey.

On the night of 3–4 September Joffre sent a handwritten note to Gallieni, wanting Maunoury to push east along the north bank of the Marne, although not specifying a date. This was in line with his modification of Instruction General No 4 (2 September), envisaging a giant pocket from Paris to Verdun, of which he enclosed copies to Gallieni. At 9:45 am on 4 September Gallieni, who had learned from Paris aviators the previous day that Kluck's German First Army was marching south-east across Paris, had the first of a series of telephone calls, conducted through aides, as Joffre would not come to the phone, and Gallieni refused to speak to anyone else. Gallieni proposed, depending on how much further the Germans were to be allowed to advance, to attack north of the Marne on 6 September or south of the Marne on 7 September.

Joffre's reply saying he preferred the southern option (which would take a day longer as it forced the Sixth Army to cross to south of the Marne, but would keep the Sixth Army and BEF from being separated by the river) arrived too late to reach Gallieni, who had left for a meeting with the BEF's chief of the general staff (CGS), Lieutenant General Sir Archibald Murray. That same afternoon, Major General Henry Wilson, the BEF sub-chief of the general staff, was negotiating separate plans with Franchet d'Espèrey, on the British right, which envisaged the Sixth Army attacking north of the Marne.

In the absence of news from Franchet d'Espèrey, Joffre ordered Gamelin to draft orders for Maunoury to attack south of the Marne on 7 September. This intention was also passed on to Field Marshal Sir John French, commander-in-chief]] (C-in-C) of the BEF. While Joffre was having dinner with the British liaison officer, Sidney Clive, and two visiting Japanese officers, neither of whom appeared to understand a word of French, a message arrived from Franchet d'Espèrey saying that he would be ready to attack on 6 September. At this point Gallieni, who returned to Paris to find Joffre's message from earlier in the day and a message from Wilson, insisted on speaking to Joffre personally on the telephone, informing him that it was too late to cancel the movement of Maunoury's army. Joffre agreed to bring forward the Allied offensive to 6 September and to have the Sixth Army attack north of the Marne instead, later writing that he had done so reluctantly as Maunoury would probably make contact with the Germans on 5 September, but that an extra day would have left the Germans in a more "disadvantageous" position. Tuchman argues that he may simply have been swayed by the dominant personality of Gallieni, his former superior. At 10 pm Joffre issued General Order No 6, ordering a General Allied Offensive.

On 7 September Gallieni, who had been going over Joffre's head and speaking to the war minister and President Raymond Poincaré, was ordered not to communicate directly with the government. This left Joffre "all-powerful" (in Gallieni's description), as he had sacked so many generals, leaving Gallieni his only serious rival. By early December 1914 Gallieni was being mooted as a potential commander-in-chief in Joffre's place, or minister of war, or both.

=== 1915 ===
==== Spring offensive ====
On 7 January 1915, over Joffre's opposition, President Poincaré came out in favour of the proposal of Franchet d'Espèrey, Gallieni and justice minister Aristide Briand for an expedition to Salonika, which he hoped would detach first Turkey then Austria-Hungary, leaving Germany "doomed."

Joffre fought a further major offensive in the Artois in spring 1915. He told Wilson (23 March) that "by the end of Apr[il] he would be in a condition to attack & break (underline) the line." On 4 May "he talked of getting to Namur & the war being over in 3 (months)."

==== Further promotion ====
With Viviani's government in trouble following the resignation of Theophile Delcasse as foreign minister, the unsuccessful autumn offensive and the entry of Bulgaria into the war, Viviani asked Joffre, who had told him that nine out of ten generals would make poor ministers of war, whether Gallieni would be a good replacement for Millerand. Joffre replied, "Perhaps," then, after a pause for thought, "Maybe." In the event, Briand formed a new government on 29 October 1915, with Viviani as vice-president of the council of ministers (deputy prime minister) and Gallieni as war minister.

As far back at 29 July 1915 Joffre had demanded that he be appointed commander-in-chief over all French forces, including those at the Dardanelles. By November he was again lobbying Poincaré that either a strong minister of war, backed by a strong chief of staff (e.g. Castelnau) be given strategic direction of the war—Joffre did not favour this option, believing that governments rose and fell too frequently for this to be sensible—or else that Joffre himself be appointed commander-in-chief over all fronts. Poincaré was persuaded of the latter option, and persuaded Briand, who arranged for Joffre and Gallieni to meet and shake hands.

At the meeting of the Superior Council of Defence (24 November 1915) Joffre had Briand address the demarcation of his own and Gallieni's authority, and objected to the council discussing operational matters, threatening to resign if they attempted to interfere with his "liberty.". Joffre met with Poincaré and Briand both before and after the meeting to discuss the issue. Gallieni, who favoured a strong war ministry with his own operational staff, complained bitterly in his diary about the politicians' unwillingness to stand up to Joffre. On 1 December Poincaré and Briand met with Gallieni, who agreed that Joffre be commander-in-chief, with Castelnau—who was soon sidelined—as his chief of staff, although under the war minister's orders. A presidential decree of 2 December made Joffre "Commander-in-Chief of the French Armies" (generalissimo). After considerable discussion this was approved by the Chamber of Deputies by 406–67 on 9 December. In practice, Joffre now took command over both Salonika and the Western Front, but not Morocco, Algeria or Tunisia. There was also friction over Gallieni's assertion of his right to appoint generals, Joffre's practice of communicating directly with the British generals rather than going through the war ministry, and Gallieni's maintaining contacts with generals whom Joffre had replaced.

In autumn 1915 Colonel Émile Driant, commander of a chasseurs brigade and a member of the Army Commission of the Chamber of Deputies, complained to Gallieni of how Joffre had been removing guns and garrisons from Verdun and even preparing some forts for demolition. Joffre was furious and disputed Gallieni's right to comment. The council of ministers discussed his reports, and Poincaré asked Gallieni to investigate. Gallieni wrote to Joffre (16 or 18 December 1915), expressing concern at the state of trenches at Verdun and elsewhere on the front; in fact, matters were already being taken in hand at Verdun.

=== 1916 ===
==== Verdun ====
The British government accepted the need to maintain the Salonika bridgehead to keep the French happy, despite being sceptical about the idea that it would bring Greece into the war on the Allied side, but British military opinion did not favour any more commitment than necessary. Argument continued with Joffre throughout the year. Late in March 1916 Joffre and Briand blocked a proposal by Lord Kitchener and Sir William Robertson to gradually withdraw five British divisions from Salonika as the Serb troops arrived.

After months of discussion, Haig and Joffre agreed on 14 February 1916 to an Anglo-French offensive on the Somme, although the British were not pleased at Joffre's suggestion that the British engage in "wearing out" attacks prior to the main offensive. The German attack on Verdun began on 21 February, reducing the planned French commitment to the Somme.

The French General Staff had decided in August 1915 to partially disarm all the Verdun forts, under the erroneous assumption that they could not resist the effects of modern heavy artillery, and the Germans initially made good progress against fortifications that had had their guns removed. Fort Douaumont, the keystone of the system of Verdun forts, had been given up without a fight, becoming a shelter and operational base for German forces just behind their front line. In the words of one French divisional commander, its loss would cost the French army a hundred thousand lives.

Joffre's political position had already weakened after the enormous losses of 1915, and now rumours circulated in Paris that Joffre had ordered the abandonment of Verdun when the Germans first attacked. Gallieni demanded to see all paperwork from the period, but Joffre had made no such order in writing, merely despatching Castelnau to assess the situation.

The political atmosphere had become poisonous. Gallieni presented a highly critical report to the council of ministers on 7 March—read in his usual precise way—criticising Joffre's conduct of operations over the last eighteen months and demanding ministerial control, then resigned. It is unclear whether he was specifically trying to have Joffre ousted as Poincaré believed. With the survival of the government at stake, General Roques was appointed minister of war after it had been ensured that Joffre had no objections. Joffre himself had been mooted for the job.

==== The Somme ====
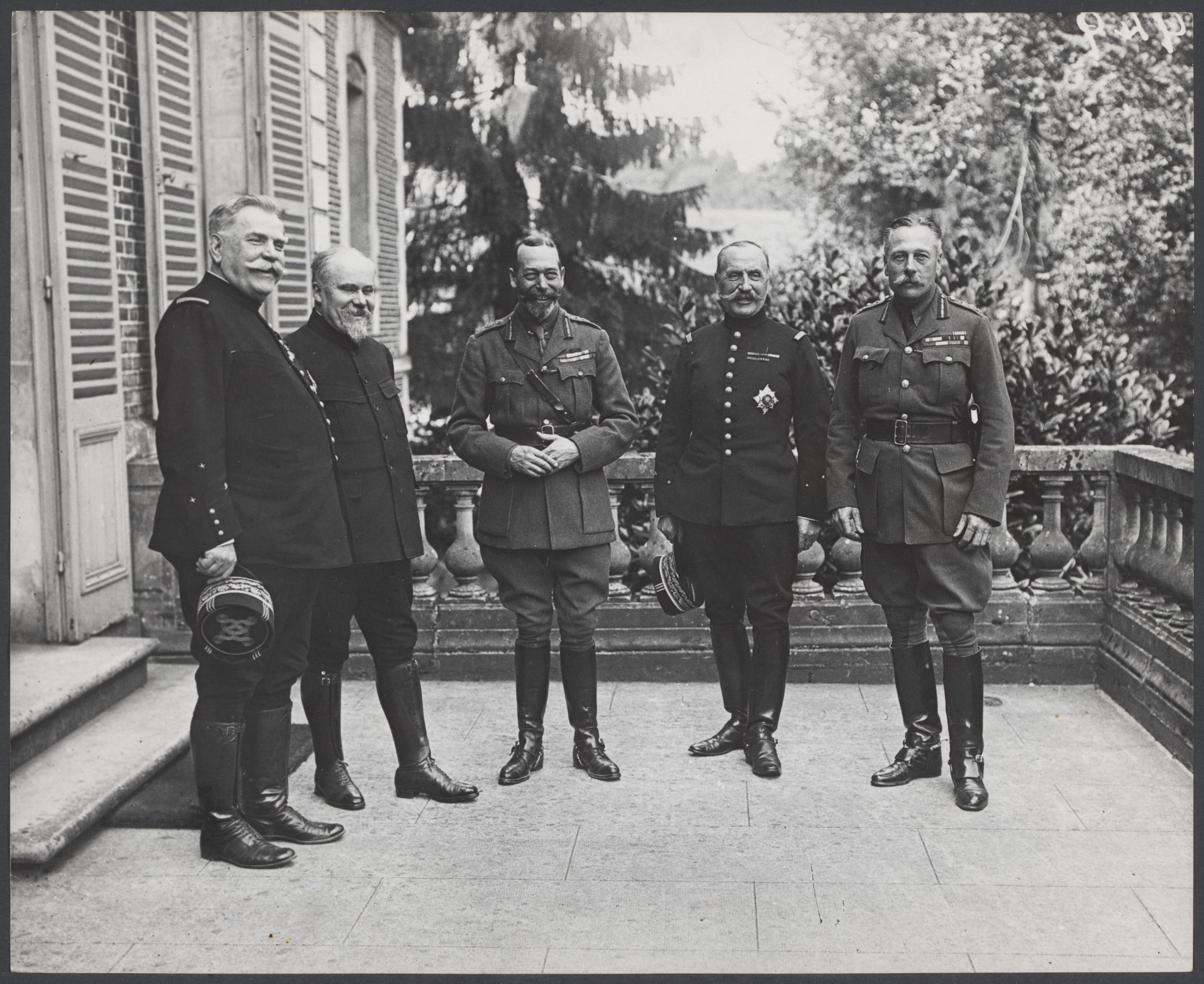
British and French leaders at Beauquesne, France, August 1916. From left to right: Joseph Joffre, Raymond Poincaré, King George V, General Ferdinand Foch; General Haig.

Early in 1916 Joffre asked the British commander-in-chief, Sir Douglas Haig, to put in a good word with Lord Bertie, the British ambassador in Paris, so that it would get back to the French government. General Haig wanted to delay the Anglo-French offensive at the Somme until 15 August to allow for more training and more artillery. When told of this Joffre shouted at Haig that "the French Army would cease to exist" and had to be calmed down with "liberal doses of 1840 brandy." The British refused to agree to French demands for a joint Anglo-French offensive from the Salonika bridgehead. Eventually, perhaps influenced by reports of French troop disturbances at Verdun, Haig agreed to attack at the start of July. This was just in time, as it later turned out that Philippe Pétain, commander at Verdun, was warning the French government that the "game was up" unless the British attacked.

Joffre was successfully lobbied by Robertson, and at the second Chantilly Conference (15–16 November 1916) they agreed to concentrate on the Western Front in 1917 rather than sending greater resources to Salonika.

==== Fall from power ====
The fall of Bucharest (6 December 1916) not only ruled out a Russo-Romanian attack on Bulgaria, but also made possible a Central Powers attack on Salonika. One of Joffre's last official duties (11 December) was to order Maurice Sarrail to cease his offensive and establish a strong defensive position, from which further offensives might be launched in the future. To Briand's and Joffre's surprise, Roques, the minister of war, returned from a fact-finding mission to Salonika recommending that Sarrail be reinforced and that he no longer report to Joffre. Coming on the back of the disappointing results of the Somme campaign and the fall of Romania, Roques's report further discredited Briand and Joffre and added to the parliamentary deputies' demands for a closed session. On 27 November the council of ministers met to debate rescinding the decree of 2 December 1915, which had placed Sarrail under Joffre; Briand proposed that Joffre be effectively demoted to commander-in-chief in North-East France, reporting to the war minister along with the commander-in-chief at Salonika, although he withdrew this proposal after Joffre threatened resignation. During the closed session (28 November – 7 December) Briand had little choice but to make concessions to preserve his government, and in a speech of 29 November he promised to repeal the decree of 2 December 1915 and in vague terms to appoint a general as technical adviser to the government. He met Joffre on 3 December 1916—according to Joffre, promising to appoint him Marshal of France and to give him a staff of his own and "direction of the war".

On 13 December Briand formed a new government, which that day survived a vote of confidence by only thirty votes. Joffre was appointed "general-in-chief of the French armies, technical adviser to the government, consultative member of the War Committee", with Robert Nivelle as commander-in-chief of the Armies of the North and Northeast. It is unclear exactly what Briand had told Joffre about his role; he commented, "This is not what they promised me," when reading the newspaper on the morning of 13 December and was put out to be described as "general-in-chief" rather than "commander-in-chief." He departed at once for Paris, but was persuaded to accept by Briand. On 17 December, he told the British liaison officer, Sidney Clive, "I am the commander-in-chief and I intend to command effectively." However, he soon found that he had no real power—the acting war minister (Admiral Lacaze, as General Lyautey had not yet returned from North Africa to take up the position) forbade him even to approve units' being granted the fourragère—and on 26 December, the day he was promoted Marshal of France, he asked to be relieved. Joffre was still popular and was the first man to be promoted Marshal under the Third Republic.

=== Post-command career ===
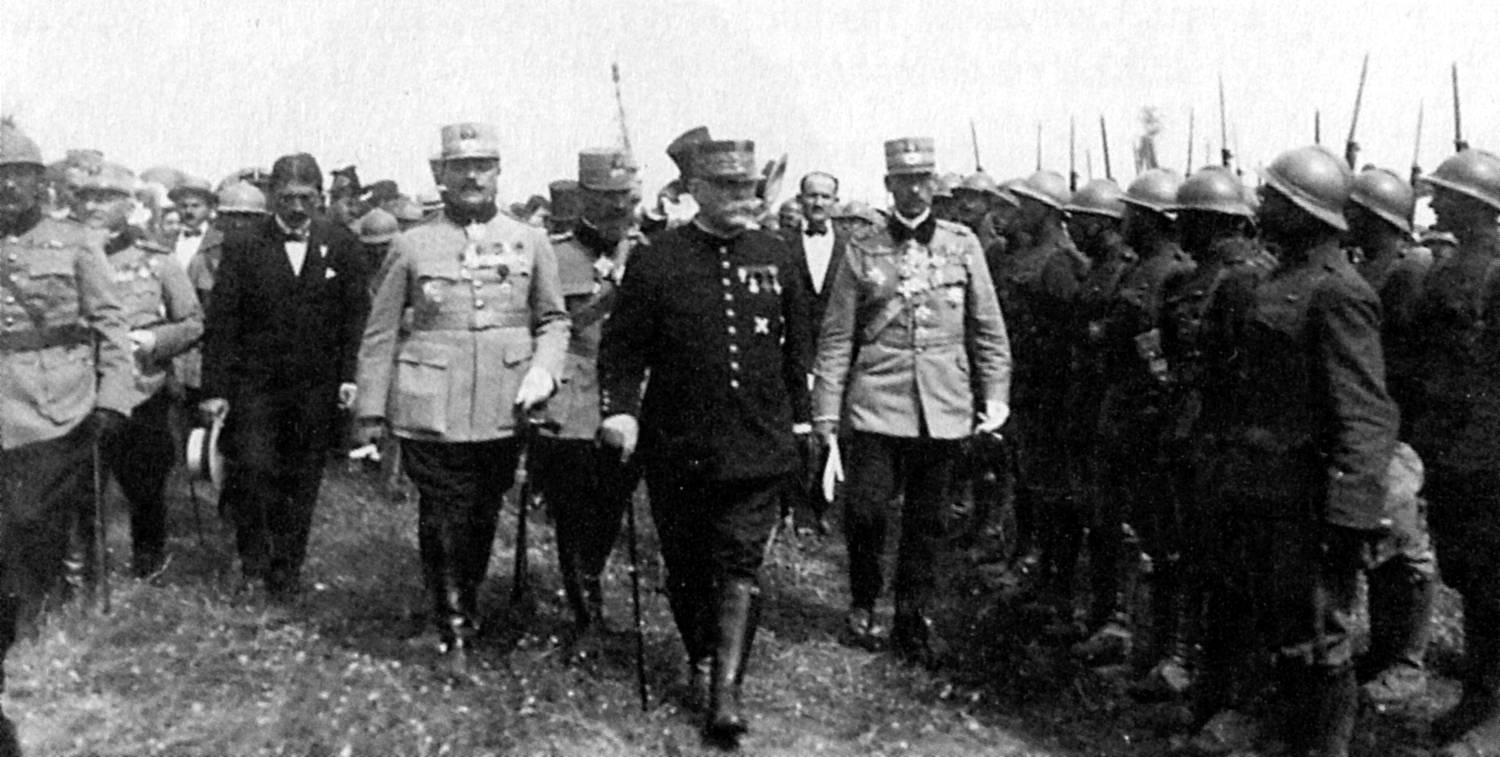
Joffre inspecting Romanian troops

On 1 April 1917 Prime Minister Ribot asked Joffre to go on Viviani's mission to the United States. There was already a similar British mission being prepared, led by Arthur Balfour, Foreign Secretary and a former Prime Minister. The French along with the British had been preparing to do so since February after the announcement of the severance of diplomatic relations between the United States and Germany, in the expectation that an American declaration of war against Germany was imminent. He was initially reluctant to go as the Nivelle Offensive was underway. On 6 April the United States Congress declared war on Germany. The main problem for their new army would be training men and, especially, officers. Joffre initially considered recommending the incorporation of US companies and battalions into the French and British armies, but realised that the Americans would never accept this.

The party sailed to the US on the Lorraine II, making an effort to cultivate reporters on board, who noticed how busy Joffre kept his small staff. While at sea he learned of the failure of Nivelle's offensive. He landed on 24 April at Hampton Roads, where he was welcomed by Admiral Henry Mayo, commander-in-chief of the US Atlantic Fleet, Ambassador Jean Jules Jusserand and Assistant Secretary of the Navy Franklin Roosevelt. He arrived in Washington the following morning, where he met Secretary of State Robert Lansing and Arthur Balfour. Joffre stayed in Washington for ten days, and addressed both Houses of Congress individually. On 27 April he met Army Chief of Staff Hugh Scott and his deputy, Tasker Bliss. Joffre recommended sending a single American unit to France at once and requested that the Americans send railroads, automobiles and trucks for the French Army. On 30 April the British Major-General Tom Bridges lobbied for US troops to be used to reinforce the British Army, arguing this would lessen the language and food differences.

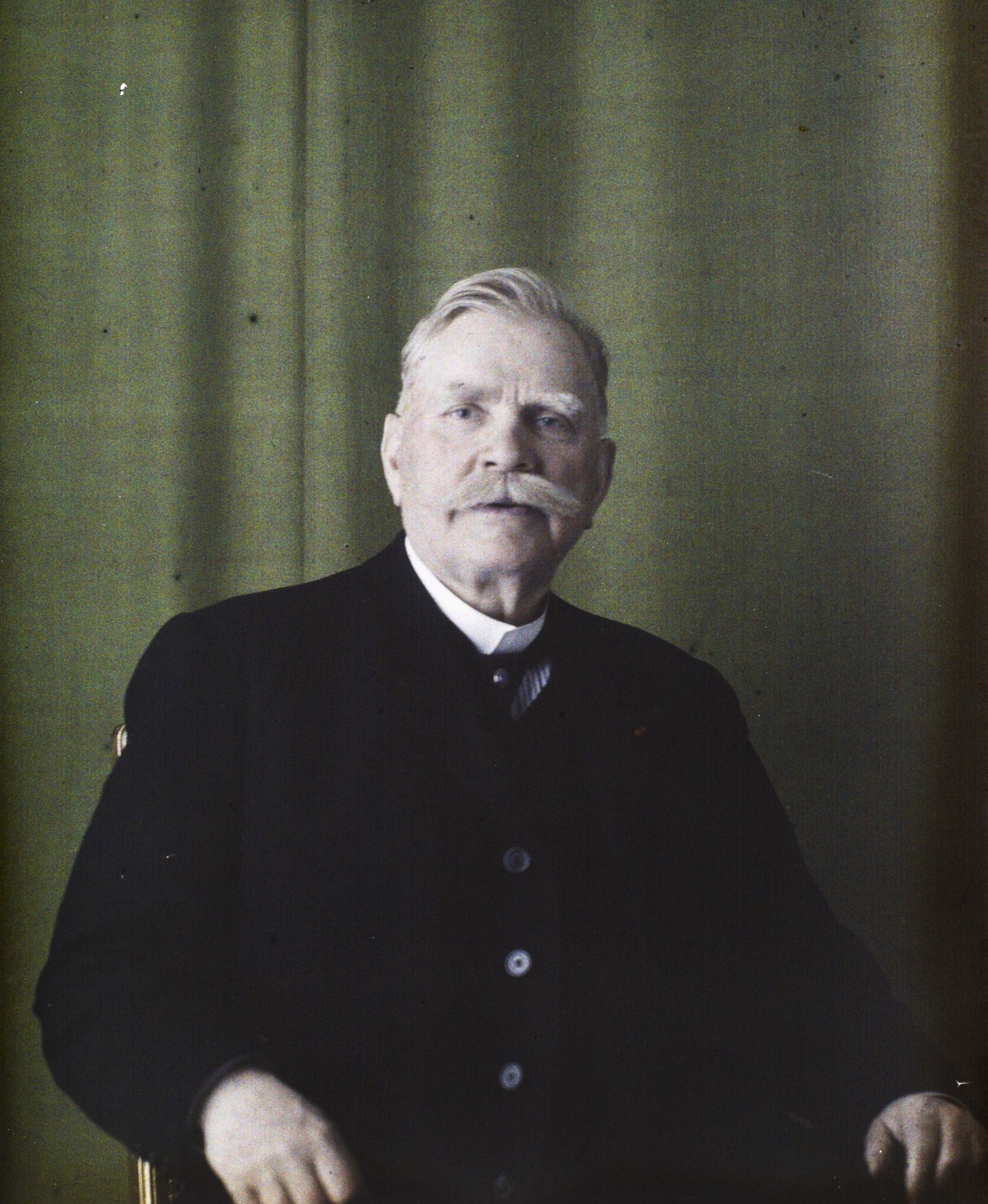
Autochrome portrait by Auguste Léon, 1922

Joffre left a paper arguing for a separate American force, then on 4 May began a week's tour of the eastern US. In full view of the press, he waited his turn in a barber's shop in St. Louis for a haircut, visited the hometowns of Abraham Lincoln (Springfield, Illinois) and Ulysses Grant, laid wreaths at the statues of Joan of Arc and Lafayette, and visited the United States Military Academy at West Point, New York. He returned on 10 May to find that the US authorities agreed with the recommendations in his paper. The US 1st Infantry Division, made up largely of Regular soldiers, was to be sent at the start of June. On the last day of his visit to Washington, Newton D. Baker, the secretary of war, introduced him to Major General John J. Pershing, who had just selected to command the American Expeditionary Forces (AEF) destined to fight in France. Joffre told him that "he can always count on me for anything in my power."

On 13 June Pershing, who had landed at Boulogne that morning, met Joffre, Paul Painlevé (war minister), Viviani and Foch (chief of staff) in Paris. Joffre recommended that an American unit be rushed to France to show the flag. The 2nd Battalion, 16th Infantry Regiment, 1st Division, was sent, and was reviewed by Joffre and President Poincaré as it marched up the Champs-Élysées on 4 July. Pershing rejected Painlevé's suggestion that Joffre head the liaison group of French officers who were helping to set up his supply lines; the American commander insisted on using the Atlantic ports of Brest, St Nazaire and Rochefort.

Joffre became leader of the Supreme War Council in 1918. That same year, he was elected to the American Philosophical Society.

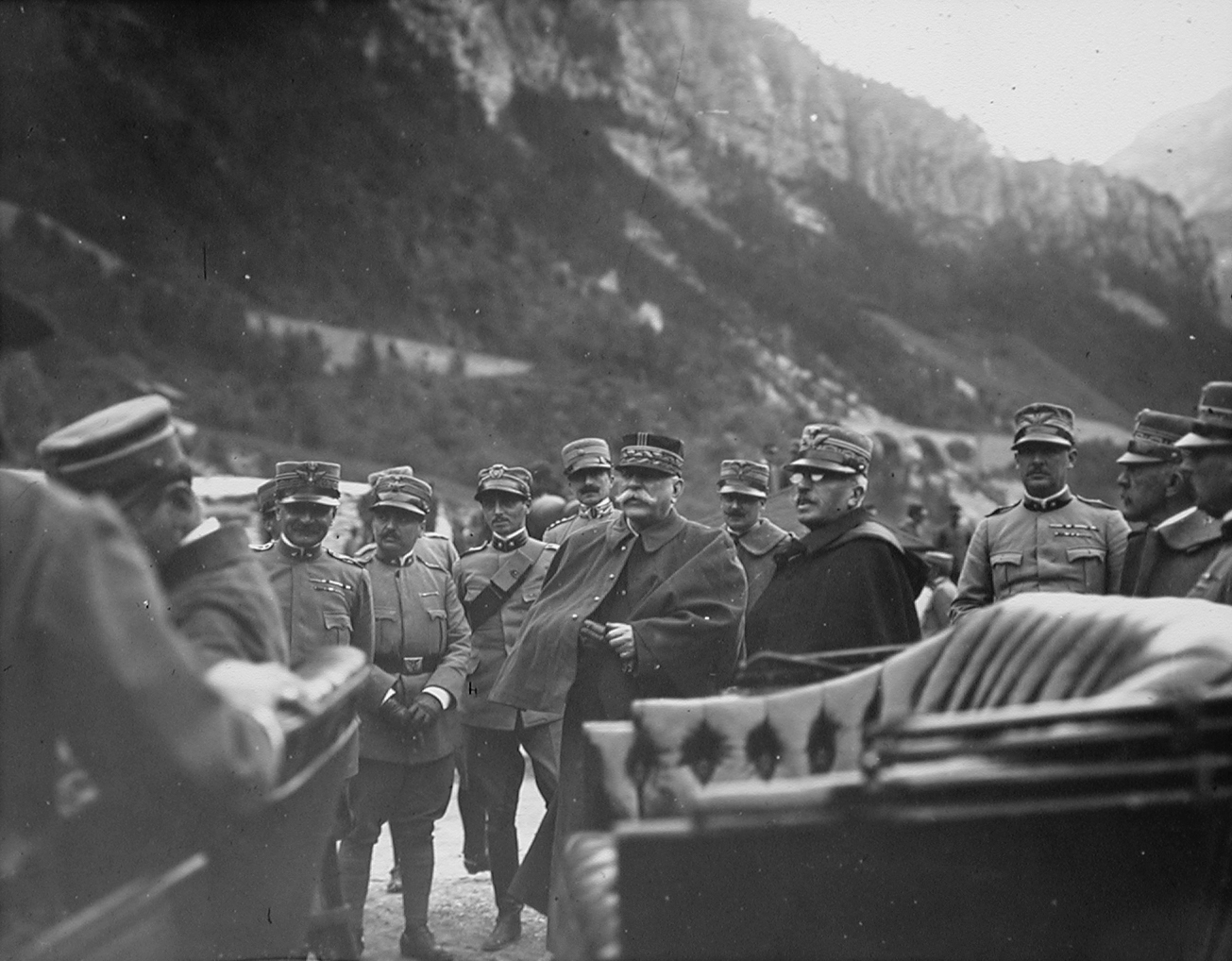
Joffre during a visit to the Val Fella Valley, Italy.

When he retired in 1919, he was made a member of the Académie française and an International Honorary Member of the American Academy of Arts and Sciences. In 1920 he presided over the Jocs Florals in Barcelona, a Catalan literary certamen (he was born in French Catalonia and his mother tongue was Catalan).

In 1922 he was welcomed in Broadway, New York with a ticker-tape parade, a few months after Ferdinand Foch, the Supreme Allied Commander during World War I.

== Death ==
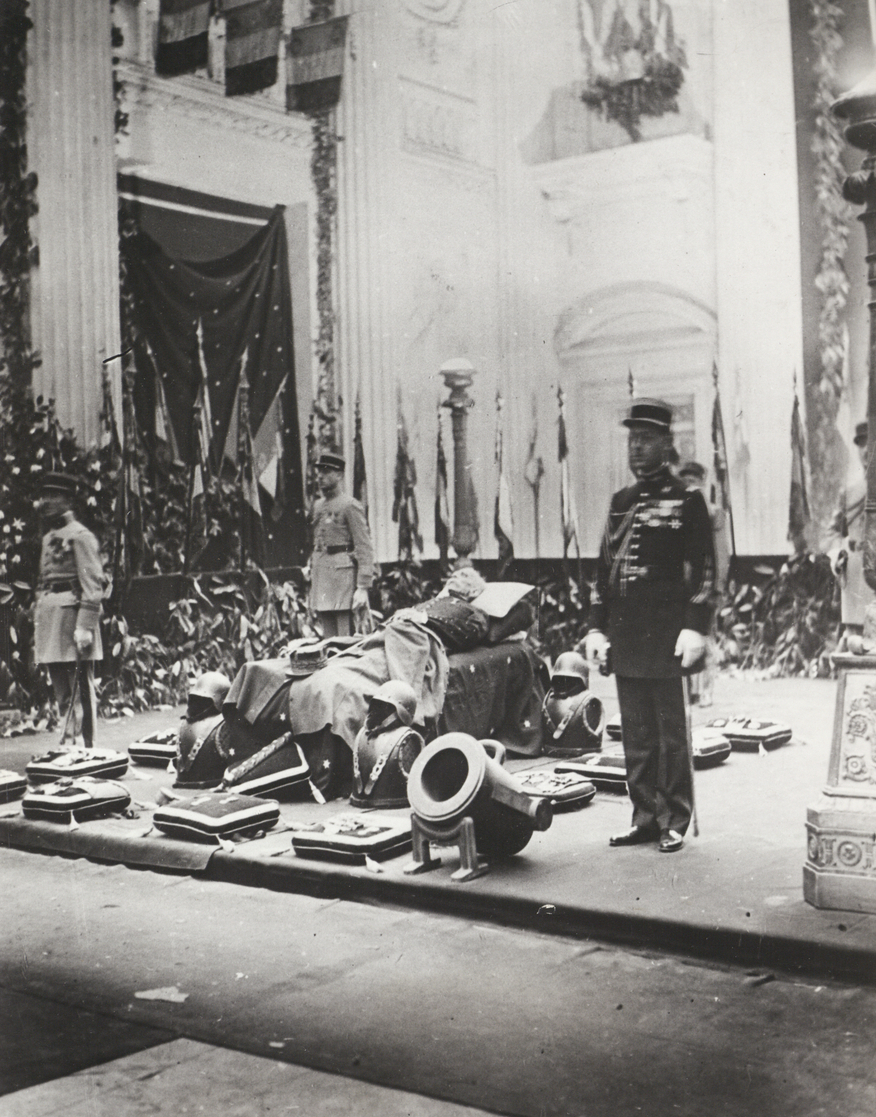
Joffre's corpse exhibited at the Special Chapel of the École Militaire

Joffre died at the age of 78 in Paris on 3 January 1931. His body was buried on his estate at Louveciennes. His memoirs, in two volumes, were published posthumously in 1932.

== Personality and assessments ==
Joffre was initiated into Freemasonry in 1875, at the lodge Alsace-Lorraine. According to British author Alan Palmer, many French generals were of the generation educated in the Catholic teaching which had grown up after the Loi Falloux and therefore, unlike Joffre, suspected of hostility to the Third Republic.

Joffre was generally taciturn and a man of impenetrable calm, sometimes interspersed with furious anger. He would sometimes turn up at a unit's headquarters, listen to reports, and then depart having said hardly a word, to the consternation of the officers he had just inspected. At the time of the Battle of the Marne, he was heavily dependent on his deputy chief of staff, General Henri Mathias Berthelot. Sir John French, commander-in-chief of the British Expeditionary Force, thought highly of him. Georges Boillot, winner of the French Grand Prix in 1912 and 1913, was Joffre's personal driver in 1914, and Joffre's car tearing along roads became a familiar sight.

General Hubert Lyautey thought Joffre a better logistician than strategist. His major positive contributions in 1914 were his sustained calm under pressure and calculated reasoning. He is credited with the dismissal of unsuccessful generals, including three army commanders, ten corps commanders and thirty-eight divisional commanders, replacing them with competent men like Foch, Franchet d'Espèrey and—more junior at that stage—Pétain and Nivelle, and his outstanding logistical handling of French infantry divisional movements and artillery ammunition supplies during and after the French retreat of August 1914.

Doughty writes of the Marne: "Gallieni's role was important, but the key concept and decisions lay with Joffre." Joffre recovered from the initial disastrous attacks into Lorraine and the Ardennes and redeployed forces to the west. He kept his cool when the initial attempt to have Maunoury envelop the German west flank at Amiens failed, requiring a retreat on Paris. While the Battle of the Marne was going on, he handled the problems faced by Foch's Ninth Army at the St Gond Marshes, by de Langle's Fourth and Sarrail's Third near Verdun and by Castelnau's Second in the Nancy area.

General Léon Zeller, in his war memoirs, describes the Marshal:

“Endowed with intellectual qualities as robust as his physical constitution, he commanded with common sense, foresight, and genuine authority; benevolent yet firm, giving his subordinates credit when he recognized their moral and military worth, and leaving them to attend to the details, not readily listening to long speeches, and speaking little himself, without ease or warmth. Drawn by his scientific training and his travels overseas toward realities rather than abstractions, he gave priority to matters of organization, mobilization, personnel, and equipment over those of tactics, which, lending themselves to hypotheses and variations, hold less appeal for certain precise minds. Discerning the issues that required his consideration, he reserved for himself, with unchallenged authority, the decisions pertaining to them.”

John Eisenhower writes that Joffre's "personality had a profound effect on the course of history" and he became a household name in the United States.

== Honours ==
=== French ===
- Legion of Honour:

Knight – 7 September 1885;
Officer – 26 December 1895;
Commander – 11 July 1903;
Grand Officer – 11 July 1909;
Grand Cross – 11 July 1914.

- Médaille militaire – 26 November 1914.
- Croix de guerre 1914–1918 with Palm
- Commemorative medal of the 1870–1871 War
- Tonkin Expedition commemorative medal – March 1887
- Officer of the Order of the Dragon of Annam – 1887
- Colonial Medal – Senegal, Sudan (1894)
- Jade Scepter of Emperor Khải Định of Annam – 1922

=== Foreign ===
- Morocco: Grand Cross of the Order of Ouissam Alaouite of Morocco
- United Kingdom of Great Britain and Ireland: Honorary Knight Grand Cross of the Order of the Bath (GCB)
- United Kingdom: Order of Merit (OM)
- United States: Distinguished Service Medal
- Russian Empire: Order of St. George 2nd class
- Russian Empire: Order of St. George 3rd class
- Siam: Knights Grand Commander (First Class) of the Order of Rama (Senangapati, 22 December 1921, Thailand)
- (Kingdom of Portugal) Portugal: Doctor honoris causa (Harvard University), and of the University of Porto and University of Coimbra
- :Order of Karađorđe's Star with swords (Kingdom of Serbia)
- (Kingdom of Portugal) :Grand Cross of the Order of the Tower and Sword of Portugal

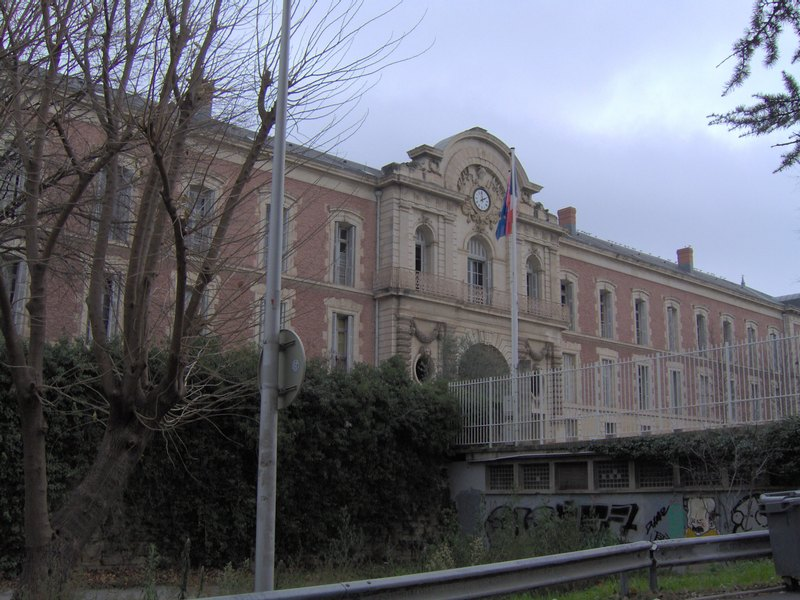
The Lycée Joffre, a high school and former military barracks in Montpellier, bears Joffre's name

=== Homages ===
The Joffre class of steam locomotives was a French Decauville design built by Kerr Stuart under contract during 1915 and 1916.

A French aircraft carrier bearing Joffre's name was under construction at the start of World War II but was never completed due to France's rapid fall in 1940.

When he visited Romania in 1920, the Casa Capșa, purveyor to the Royal Court of Romania, created the Joffre cake in his honour.

The following landmarks were named in Marshal Joffre's honour:

(a) France

- Place Joffre, Avenue de la Motte-Piquet, Paris, with bronze statue of mounted subject.
- Avenue du Maréchal Joffre located in Verdun, France
- Rue du Maréchal Joffre located in Nice, France
- Boulevard Maréchal Joffre in Dijon, France
- Avenue du Maréchal Joffre in Chantilly, France
- Joffre Peninsula, Kerguelen, French Southern and Antarctic Lands.

(b) Canada

- Mount Joffre, a mountain located on the Continental Divide on the border of British Columbia and Alberta.
- Joffre Peak, a mountain in the Lillooet Ranges of southwestern British Columbia
- Joffre Street, located in Dartmouth, Nova Scotia, Canada.
- Rue Joffre (Joffre Street), located in Shawinigan, Quebec, Canada.
- Avenue Joffre, located in Quebec City, Canada.
- Parc Maréchal-Joffre, located in Lévis, Québec, Canada.
- Joffre Avenue, located in Renfrew, Ontario, Canada.
- Pont Joffre (Joffre Bridge), located in Sherbrooke, Québec, Canada

(c) United States of America

- Joffre Street in Lowell, Massachusetts.
- Joffre, Pennsylvania, zip code 15053 (Latitude 40.4 degrees north; Longitude 80.4 degrees west).
- Joffre Avenue, located in Milltown, New Jersey, US.

(d) Australia

- Joffre Street, located in Pascoe Vale, Victoria, Australia.

(e) China (Mainland)

- Avenue Joffre (now Huaihai Road), located in the former French Concession of Shanghai, China.

(f) Romania

- Marshal Joffre Street (formerly Ion Mihalache Street), located in Timișoara, Romania.

In 1918, Mount Joffre on the Continental Divide in Western Canada was named after him. Summits with the names of other French generals are nearby: Cordonnier, Foch, Nivelle, Mangin, and Pétain.

== Gallery ==
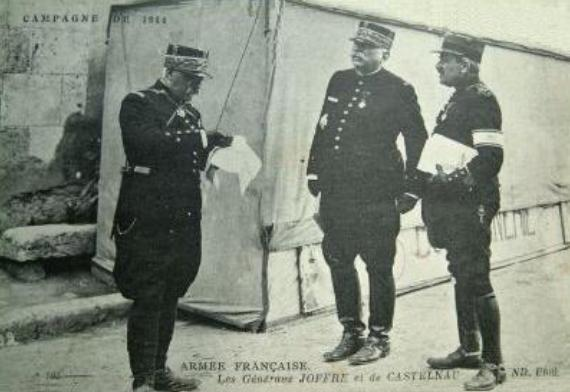
Générals de Castelnau (left) and Joffre (centre),
July–August 1914

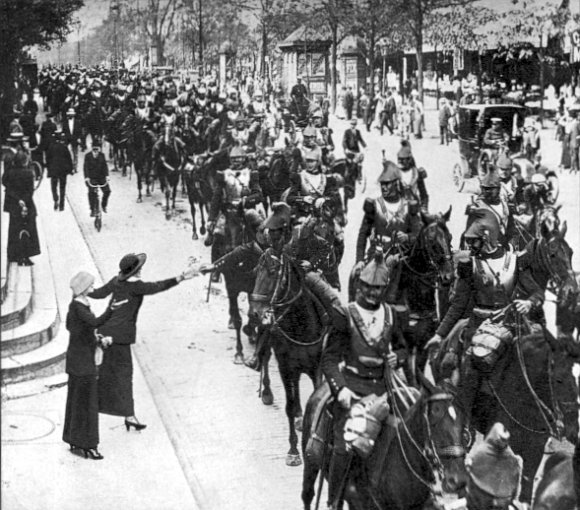
French heavy cavalry, with armour, parading in Paris before heading to the front in August 1914

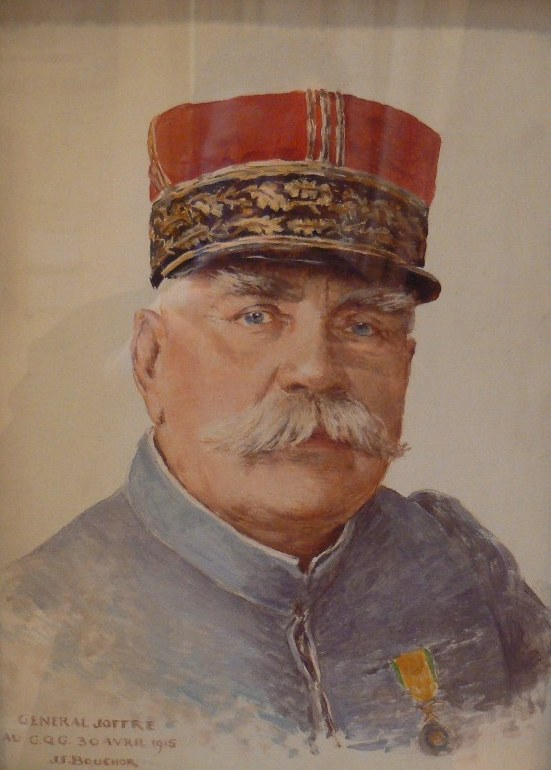
Bouchor's Le Général Joseph Joffre
in 1915 (musée Carnavalet)

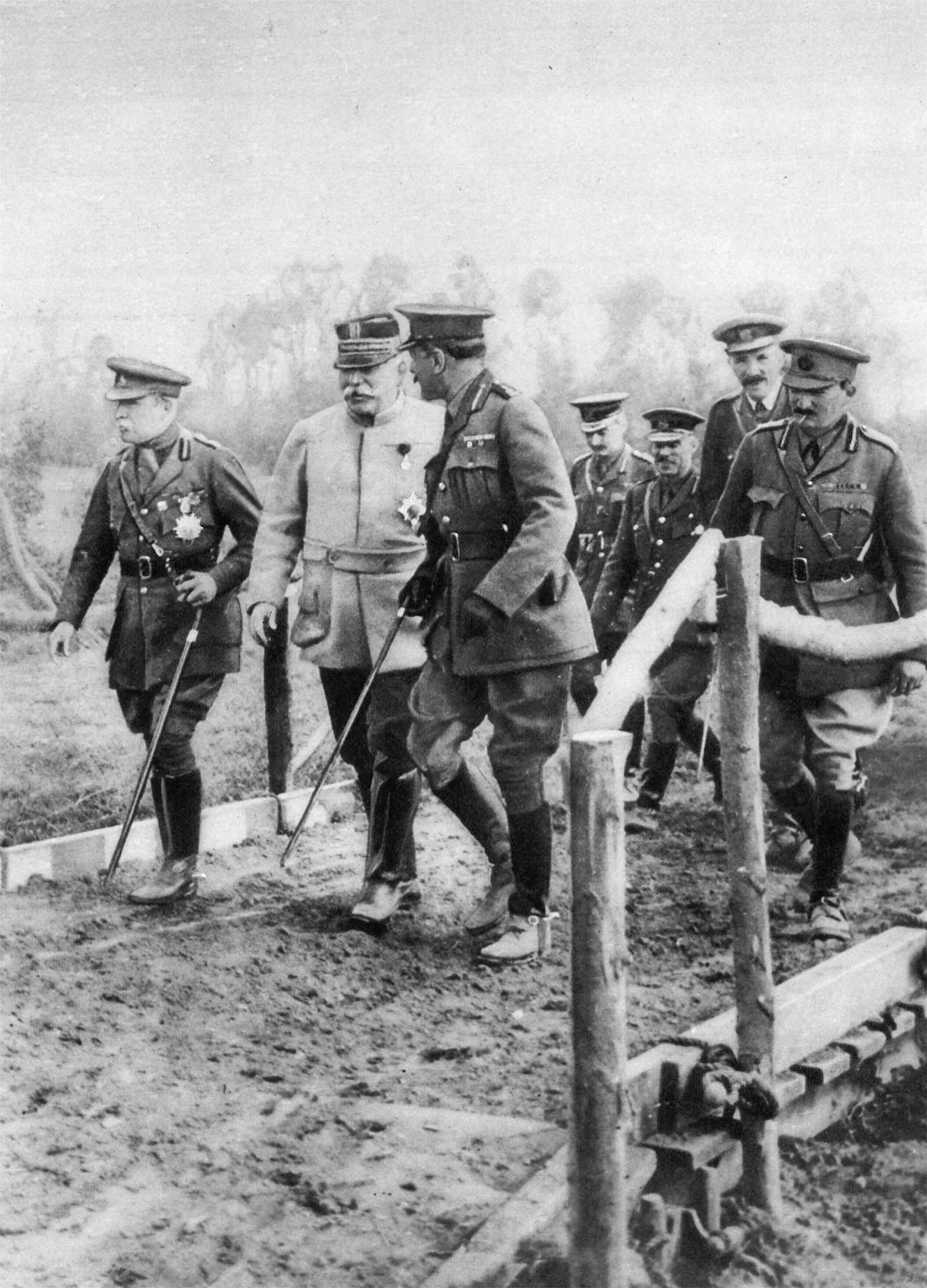
Joffre with British generals French and Haig on the Western Front in 1915

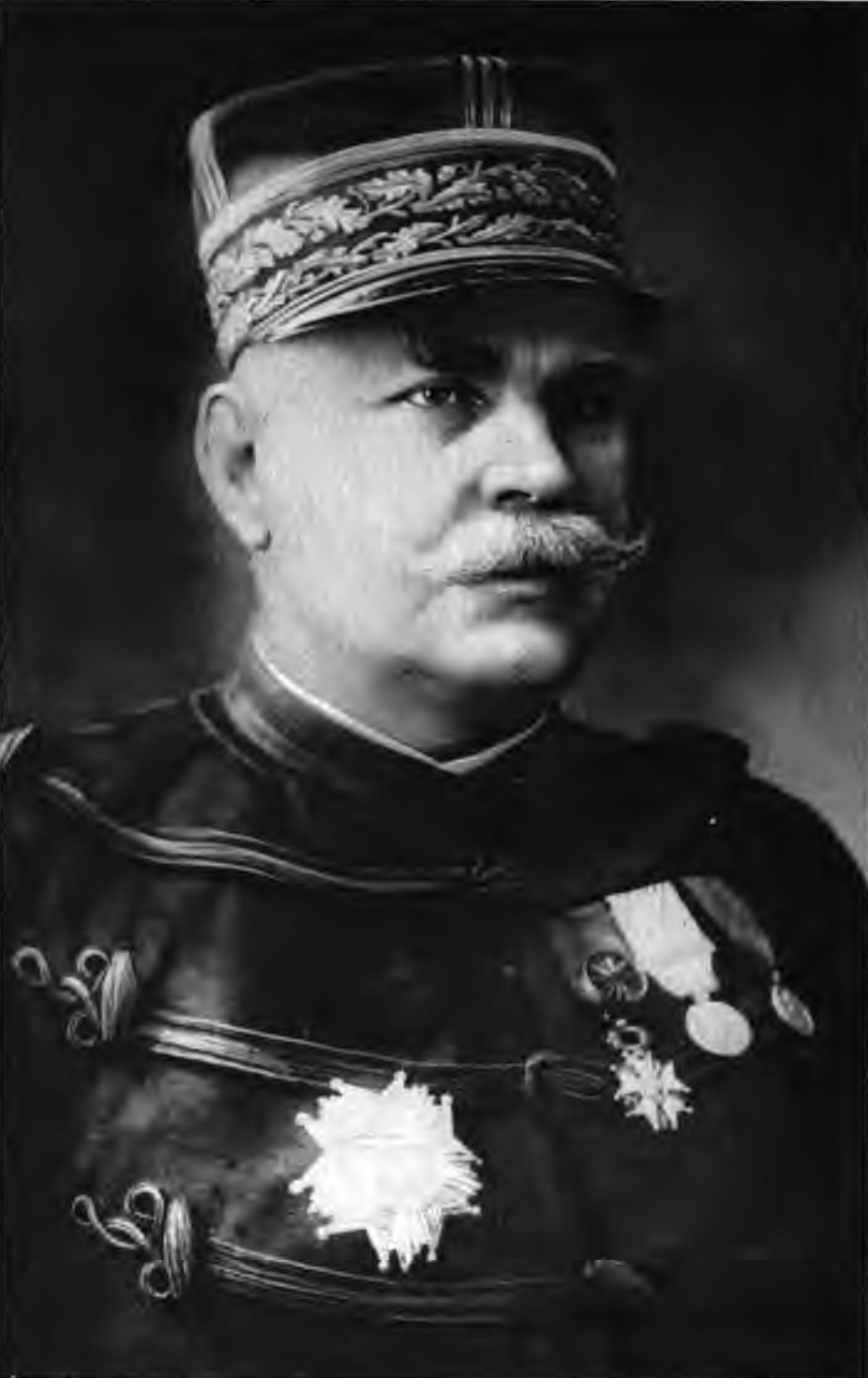
Portrait of Joseph Joffre

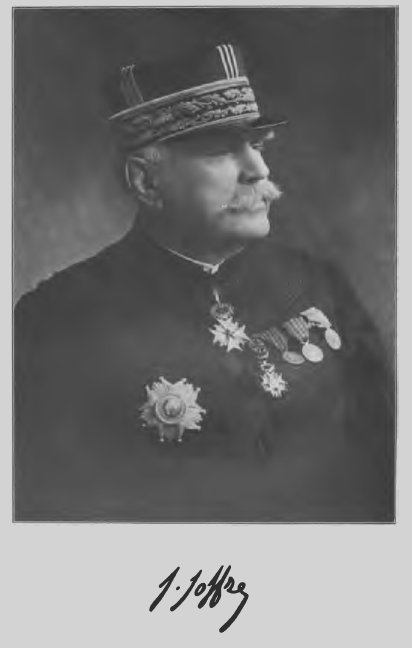
J.Joffre and his signature

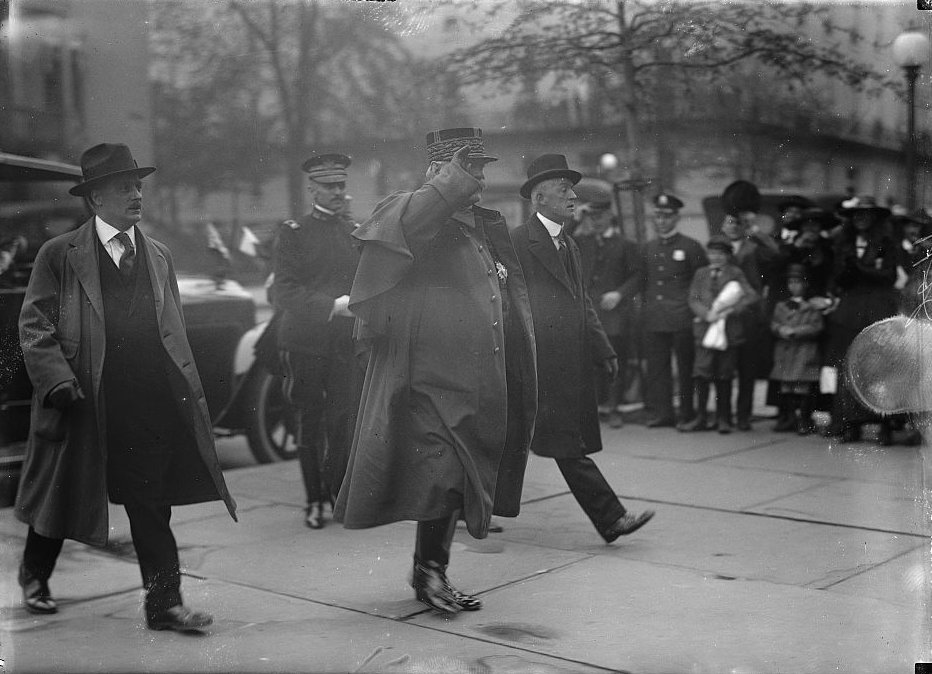
Joffre in the United States in 1917

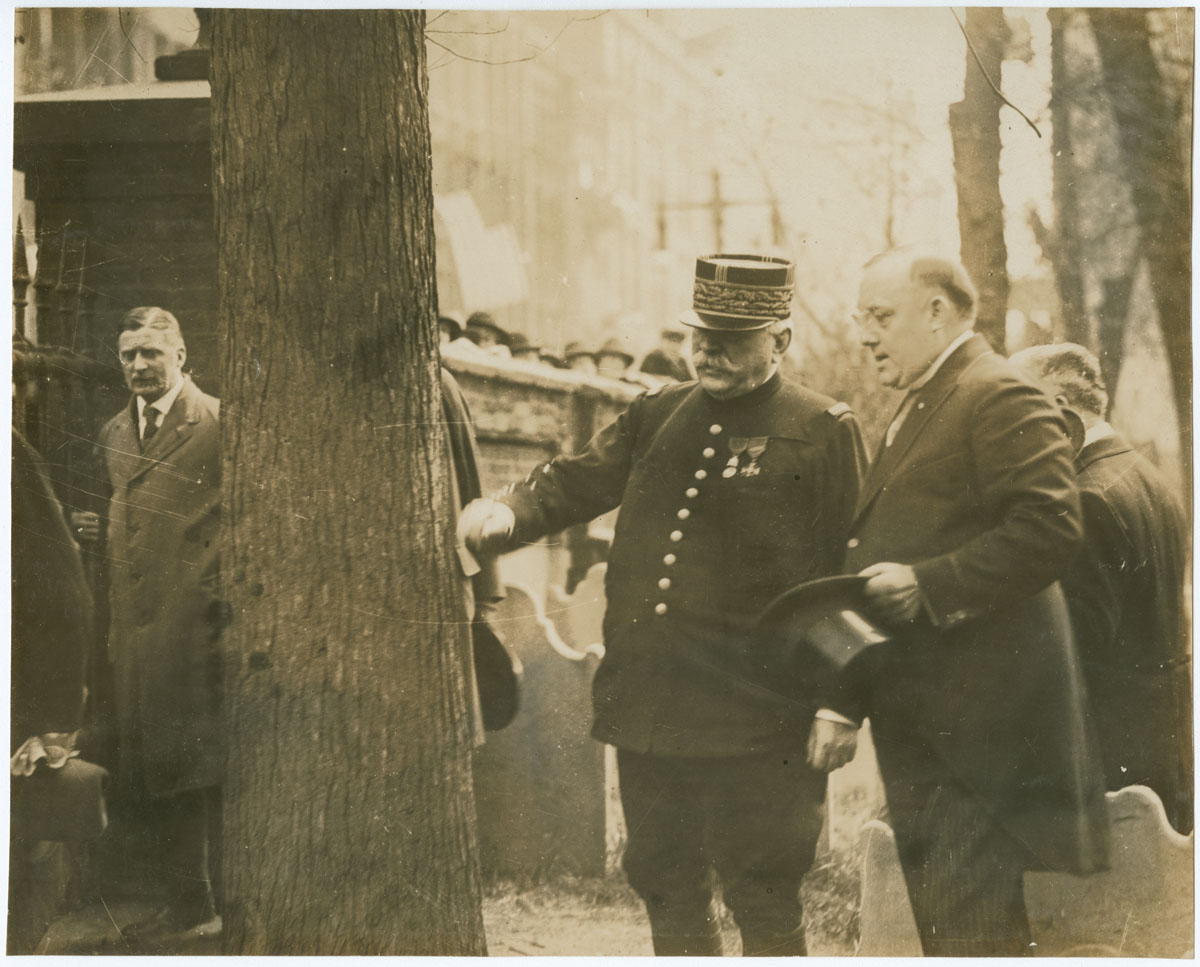
Joffre at the grave of Benjamin Franklin in 1917

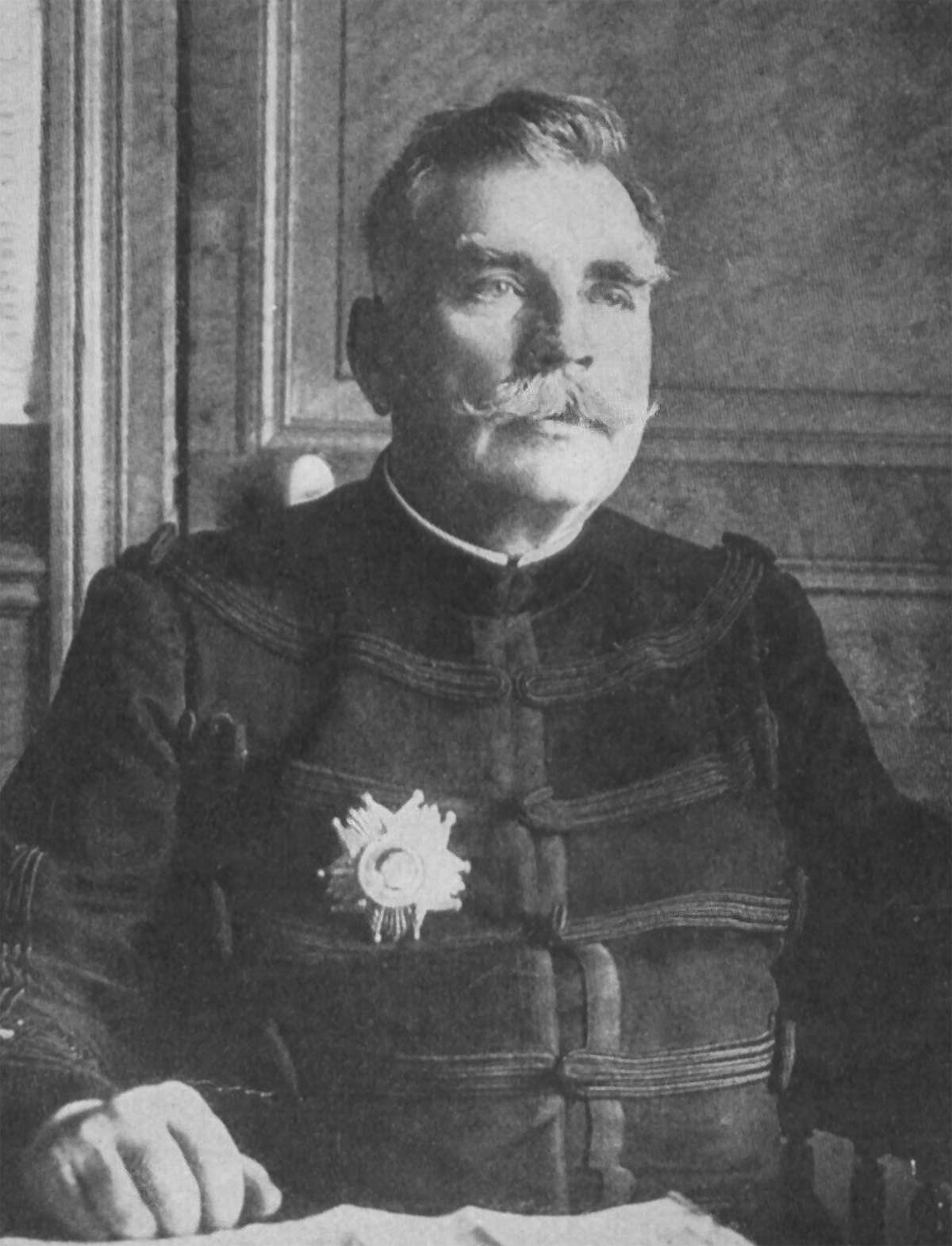
Marshal of France, Joseph Joffre

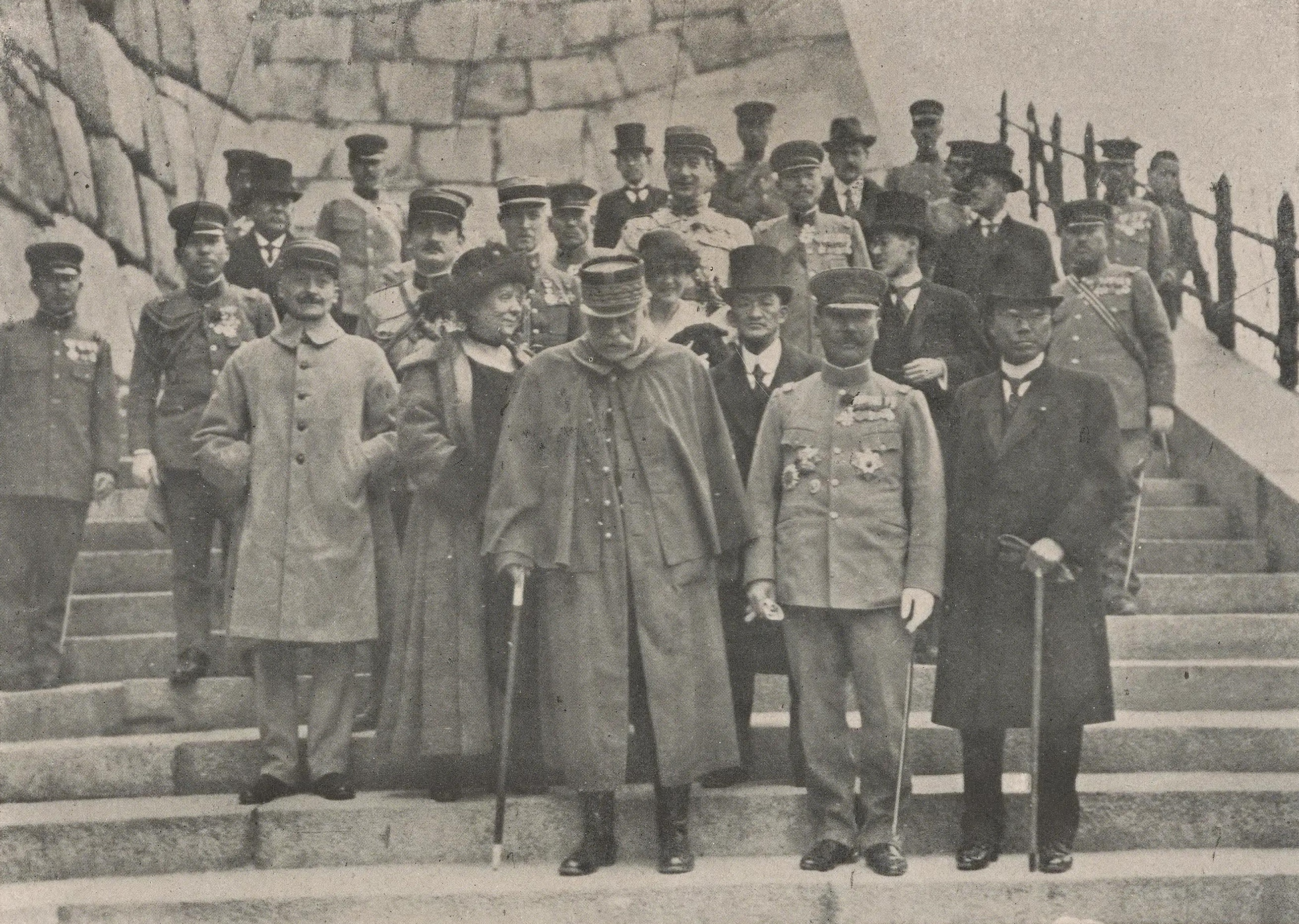
Joffre at the Osaka Castle in 1922

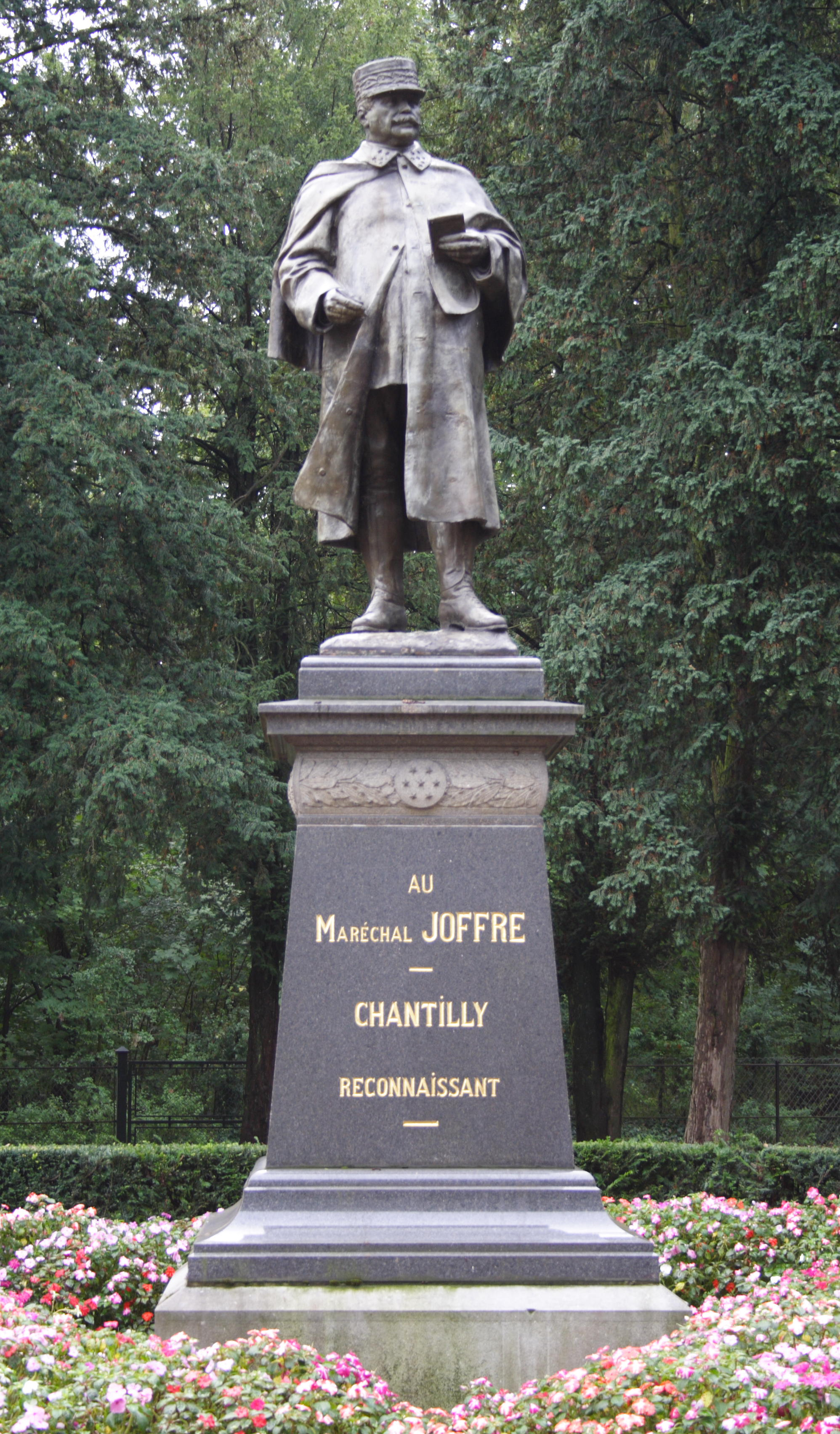
Statue of Joffre at Chantilly, erected in 1930

== See also ==
- Moroccan Division
- 2nd Marching Regiment of the 1st Foreign Regiment
- 2nd Marching Regiment of the 2nd Foreign Regiment
- Marching Regiment of the Foreign Legion
- Russian Expeditionary Force in France
- Non-US recipients of US gallantry awards

Military offices
Preceded by Auguste Dubail	Chief of the General Staff of the Army; July 1911 – 1 August 1914	Succeeded by Himself as Commander-in-Chief of the French Army
Preceded by Victor-Constant Michel	Vice President of the Superior War Council; July 1911 – 1 August 1914	Succeeded by Himself as Commander-in-Chief of the French Army
Preceded by Himself as Vice President of the Superior War Council	Commander-in-Chief of the French Army; 2 August 1914 – 15 December 1916	Succeeded by Robert Nivelle
