= Robert Nivelle =

French artillery general officer (1856–1924)

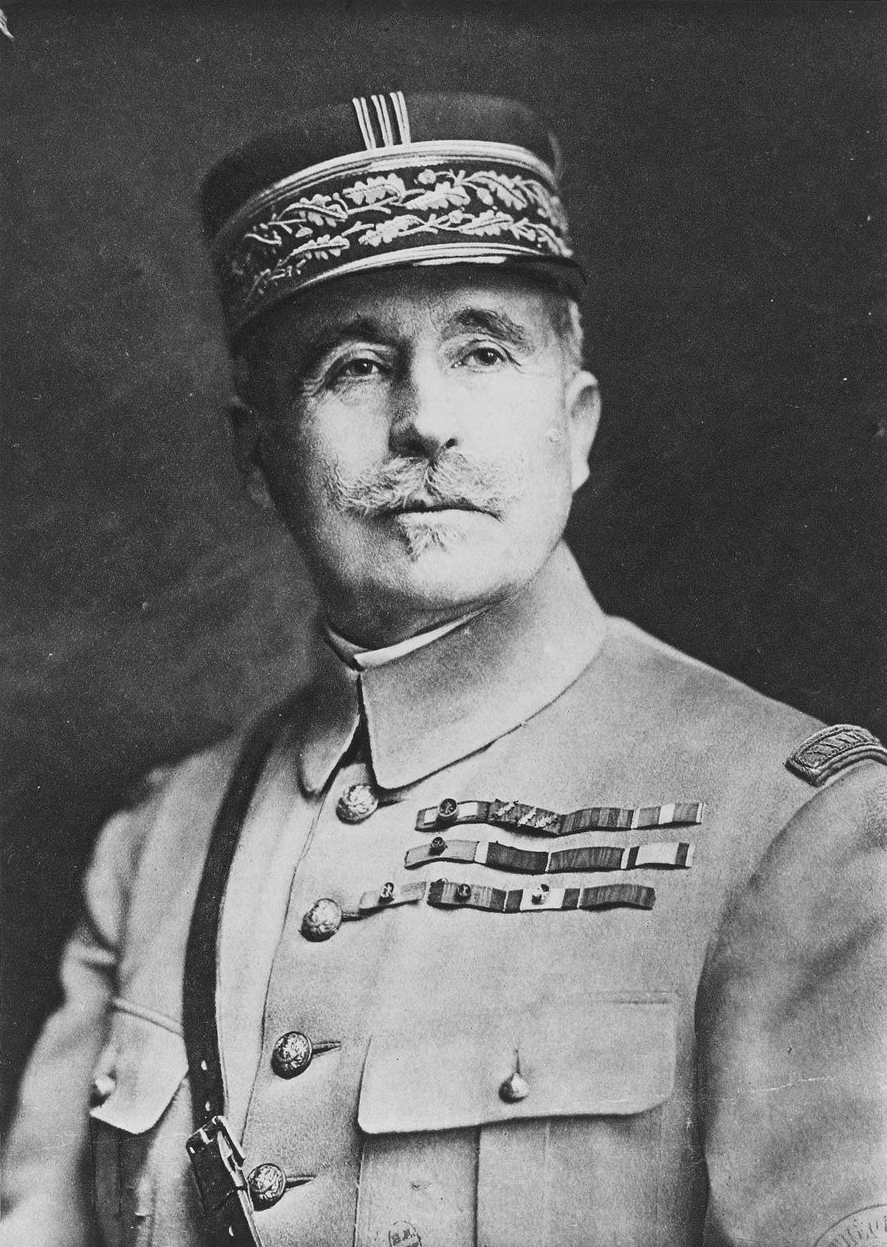
- General Nivelle c. 1917

24th Chief of the Army Staff of France
- In office 14 December 1916 – 30 April 1917
- President: Raymond Poincaré
- Prime Minister: Aristide Briand; Alexandre Ribot; Paul Painlevé
- Minister of War: Hubert Lyautey; Lucien Lacaze (as interim); Paul Painlevé
- Preceded by: Joseph Joffre
- Succeeded by: Philippe Pétain

25th Commander of the 3rd Army Corps
- In office 1 May – 15 December 1916
- President: Raymond Poincaré
- Minister of War: Pierre Roques; Hubert Lyautey
- Chief of Staff: Joseph Joffre
- Preceded by: Émile Hector Hache
- Succeeded by: Leonce Lebrun

3rd Commander of the 2nd Army
- In office 23 December 1915 – 21 April 1916
- President: Raymond Poincaré
- Minister of War: Joseph Gallieni; Pierre Roques
- Chief of Staff: Joseph Joffre
- Preceded by: Philippe Pétain
- Succeeded by: Adolphe Guillaumat

Personal details
- Born: 15 October 1856 Tulle, French Empire
- Died: 22 March 1924 (aged 67) Paris, French Republic
- Education: École Polytechnique

Military service
- Allegiance: (French Third Republic) Third Republic
- Branch/service: French Army: Artillery
- Years of service: 1878 – 1921
- Rank: Division general
- Commands: List: 5th Artillery Regiment; 27th Infantry Brigade; 61st Reserve Infantry Division; III Corps; Second Army
- Battles/wars: List: Boxer Rebellion; First World War; Battle of Verdun; Nivelle Offensive

Robert Georges Nivelle (Note: French: [nivɛl]) (15 October 1856 – 22 March 1924) was a French artillery general officer who served in the Boxer Rebellion and the First World War. In May 1916, he succeeded Philippe Pétain as commander of the French Second Army in the Battle of Verdun, leading counter-offensives that rolled back the German forces in late 1916. During these actions, he and General Charles Mangin were accused of wasting French lives. He gave his name to the Nivelle Offensive.

Following the successes at Verdun, Nivelle was promoted to commander-in-chief of the French armies on the Western Front in December 1916, largely because of his persuasiveness with French and British political leaders, aided by his fluency in English. He was responsible for the Nivelle Offensive at the Chemin des Dames, which had aroused skepticism already in its planning stages. When the costly offensive failed to achieve a breakthrough on the Western Front, a major mutiny occurred, affecting roughly half the French Army, which conducted no further major offensive action for several months. Nivelle was replaced as commander-in-chief by Philippe Pétain on 15 May 1917.

== Early life and career ==
Robert Georges Nivelle, born on 15 October 1856 in the French provincial town of Tulle in Corrèze, had a French father and an English Protestant mother. Nivelle also was a Protestant; this was a help to him, for in the politics of the French military, Catholic piety was a handicap. He began his service in the French Army in 1878 upon graduating from the École Polytechnique. Starting as a sub-lieutenant with the French artillery, Nivelle became a colonel-of-artillery in December 1913. During that period, Nivelle served with distinction in Algeria, Tunisia and in China during the Boxer Rebellion (1898–1901).

== First World War ==
=== 1914–15 ===
Described as "an articulate and immensely self-confident gunner", Nivelle played a key role in defeating German attacks during the Alsace Offensive, the First Battle of the Marne and the First Battle of the Aisne, as a result of the intense artillery fire he organised against them. Consequently, he was promoted to the rank of general in October 1914.

=== 1916 ===
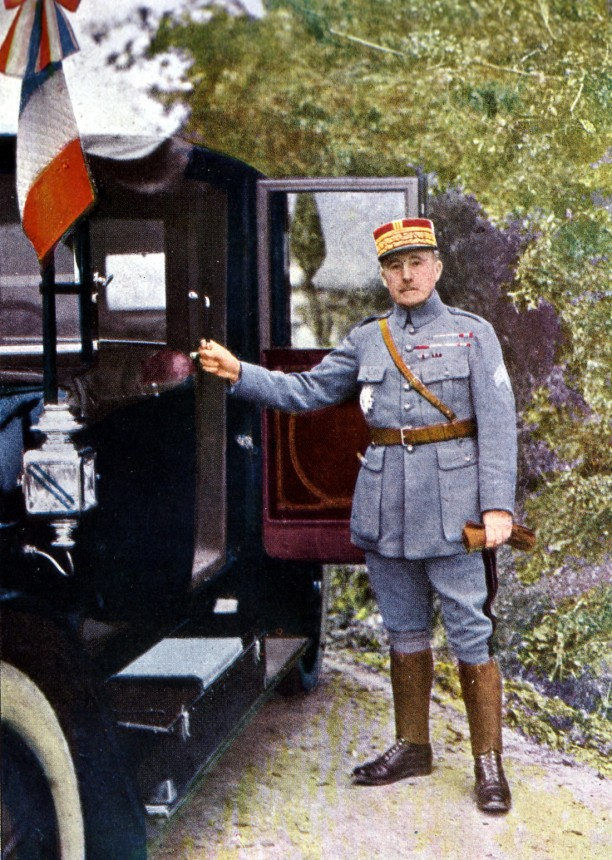
General Nivelle in 1916. Autochrome portrait by Jules Gervais-Courtellemont

In 1916 the Battle of Verdun occurred (21 February – 18 December), during which Nivelle was a subordinate to Philippe Pétain. When Pétain was promoted to the command of the French Central Army Group, Nivelle was promoted to Pétain's previous command of the French Second Army, which was fighting against the Germans at Verdun, and he took direct control of the army on 1 May 1916.

Nivelle is considered to have squandered the lives of his soldiers in wasteful counter-attacks during the Battle of Verdun; only one fresh reserve brigade was left with the Second Army by 12 June. After the Germans captured Fleury on 23 June, Nivelle issued an Order of the Day which ended with the now-famous line: Ils ne passeront pas! (They shall not pass!). Nivelle ordered the employment of a creeping barrage when the French made their initial counter-stroke on 24 October. The artillery supporting the infantry focused more on suppressing German troops as opposed to destroying specific objects. These tactics proved effective: French troops re-took Fleury on 24 October, as well as Fort Douaumont, whose capture by the Germans on 25 February 1916 had been highly celebrated in Germany. Nivelle's successful counter-strokes were an important factor behind the decision to appoint him to become the commander-in-chief of the French armies on 12 December 1916. The then French Prime Minister Aristide Briand was extremely impressed by Nivelle, telling the other leaders at the Rome Conference (January 1917) that during his Verdun attacks Nivelle had sent telegrams from various places on the advance, achieving his objectives exactly according to the predicted timetable.

=== Commander-in-Chief ===
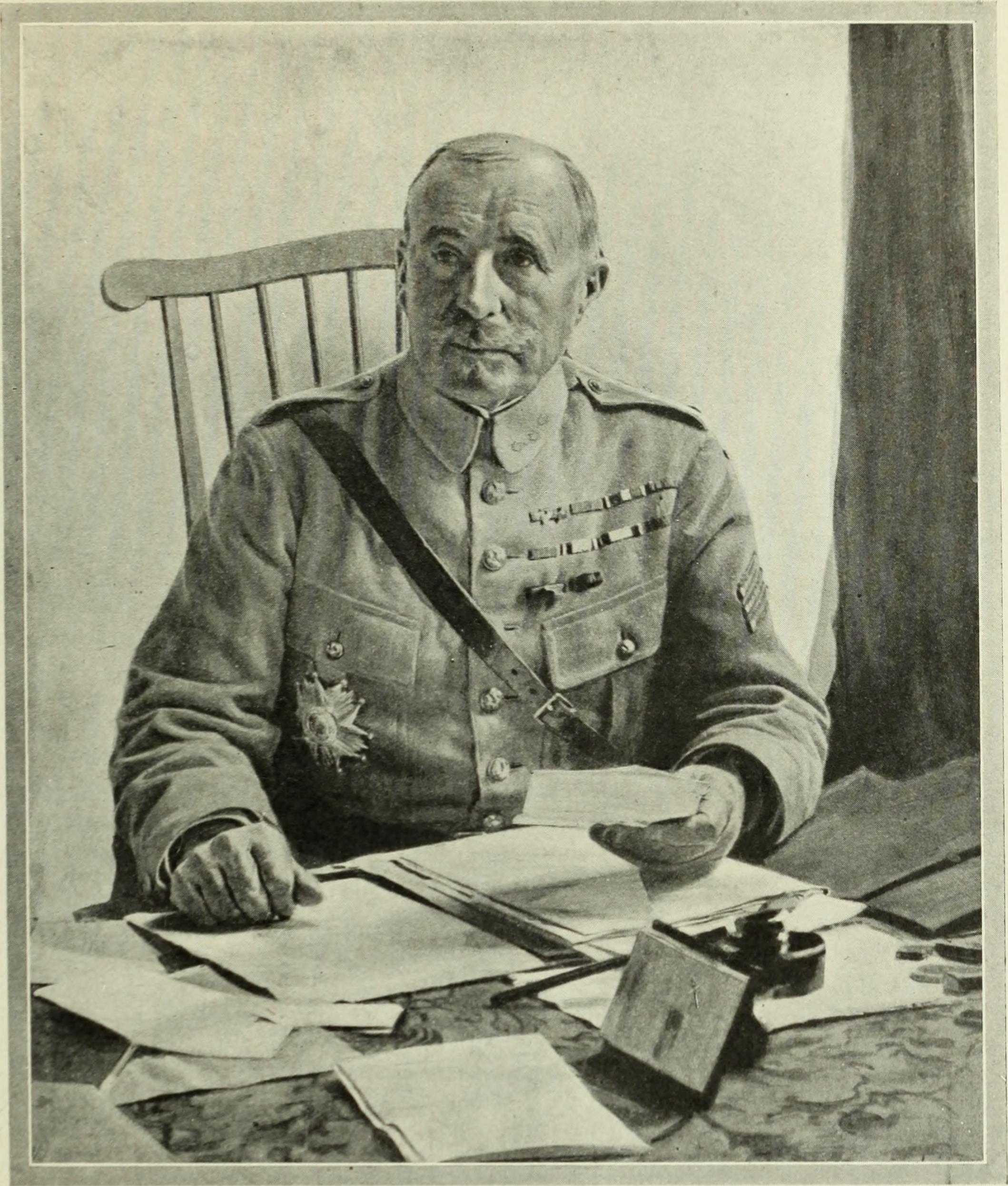
General Robert Nivelle, wearing the three stars of a General de Division in Times history of the war

Nivelle had less power than his predecessor Joffre. He was placed under the orders of the War Minister Hubert Lyautey and, unlike Joffre, Nivelle's authority did not extend over the Salonika front.

Nivelle's slogan (also attributed to Petain) was: "the artillery conquers; the infantry occupies". He believed that a saturation bombardment, followed by a creeping barrage and by aggressive infantry assaults, could break the enemy's front defences and help French troops reach the German gun-line during a single attack, which would be followed by a breakthrough within two days.

Nivelle's plan in 1917, was for the British to take over an extra 20 miles of French front to free up French troops, then Anglo-French wearing-out attacks between Arras and the Oise to keep German reserve troops occupied, then a surprise attack by French forces on the Aisne, the "GAR" (Army Group Reserve or Rupture: two armies in the line and another two (27 divisions) in reserve, 1.2 million men in total) to exploit the rupture of the German defences that was expected to occur as a result. The attack would be broken off if it did not "rupture" the German front within 48 hours.

Looking for an alternative to more months of attrition warfare, British and French political leaders supported Nivelle's proposal.

=== Relations with the British ===
Field Marshal Sir Douglas Haig, commander of the British Expeditionary Force (BEF) on the Western Front, had already agreed with Joffre that the British would launch wearing-out attacks in 1917, but demanded (6 January) written confirmation of Nivelle's earlier assurance that if the plan did not succeed in forcing a general German withdrawal, Nivelle would take over British line to free up British reserves for his planned Flanders offensive. By Edward Spears' account Nivelle accused Haig of having "une idée fixe" about Flanders and of trying to "hog all the blanket for himself" rather than seeing the front as a whole. David Lloyd George, the British Prime Minister, backed Nivelle because he thought he had "proved himself to be a Man" at Verdun.

Field Marshal Haig wanted to delay his attack until May to coincide with Italian and Russian attacks, but was told to be ready no later than 1 April, and to take over French line as requested. The British government ordered him to live up to both the "letter" and "spirit" of the agreement with Nivelle, and not cause delays, almost certainly a result of private lobbying by Nivelle.

Lloyd George had a long conversation (15 February) with Major Berthier de Sauvigny, a French liaison officer in London, telling him that Haig needed to be subordinated to Nivelle for the offensive, as George Milne had been subordinated to Sarrail at Salonika, and if necessary he would be replaced. The British War Cabinet felt that the French generals and staff had shown themselves more skilled than the British in 1916, whilst politically Britain had to give wholehearted support to what would probably be the last major French effort of the war.

Haig blamed the poor state of the railways, demanding twice the railway requirements for half as many troops as the French. At the Calais Conference the railway experts were soon sent away, and although Nivelle became embarrassed when Lloyd George asked him to criticise Haig, he agreed to draw up rules for the relations between the British and French armies, to be binding also on their successors going forward. He proposed that the British forces be placed under his direct command (via a British staff at French GQG), not just for operations but even logistics and food, with Haig sidelined and forbidden even to make direct contact with London. The British CIGS Robertson lost his temper when shown the proposals, and believed that Lloyd George, not the French, had originated them. Nivelle visited the British generals next morning, and professed astonishment that they had had no prior knowledge of the plan. As a compromise Haig was given right of appeal to the War Cabinet and retained tactical control of British forces, although Lloyd George insisted – lest the conference break up without agreement - that he still be under Nivelle's orders for the duration of the offensive.

The Germans had recently added 300 battalions to their forces by intensive mobilisation, and Haig claimed (3 March) that with the BEF spread more thinly by having taken over line to the south, these forces might be used to attack at Ypres and cut him off from the Channel Ports. Assuming Haig was inventing this threat, Nivelle wrote him a letter, addressing him as a subordinate, and revived the idea of a British staff at GQG, this time reporting to Robertson, but through whom Nivelle would issue orders to Haig. Nivelle now demanded that the BEF be split into two Army Groups or else that Haig be sacked and replaced by Gough. Nivelle also believed that Lloyd George hoped to become Allied Commander-in-Chief, a suggestion so absurd that it caused President Poincaré to laugh.

After further lobbying from Robertson and intervention by King George V, Lloyd George lost the support of the British War Cabinet and had to back down. At another conference in London (12-13 March) Lloyd George stressed that the BEF must not be "mixed up with the French Army", and Haig and Nivelle met with Robertson and Lyautey to settle their differences.

=== French doubts about the Offensive ===
Between 16 March and 20 March 1917, the Germans withdrew from the Noyon salient and a smaller salient near Bapaume. The French General Franchet d'Esperey, commander of the Northern Army Group, asked Nivelle if he could attack the Germans as they withdrew. Nivelle believed that that action would disrupt his operational plan, and refused d'Esperey's request as a result. Nivelle has since been deemed to have missed his only real opportunity to disrupt the German withdrawal.

Lyautey resigned after being shouted down in the French Chamber (15 March) and the Briand government fell (19 March). Confidence in Nivelle's planned offensive did not improve when Paul Painlevé was appointed to become the French Minister of War, as Painlevé had little faith in Nivelle's concepts. The British CIGS "Wully" Robertson described Nivelle as a commander "with a rope round his neck".

Philippe Pétain, over whose head Nivelle had been promoted to become commander-in-chief, wanted to launch a major attack against the Germans near Reims. The proposal is considered to have likely resulted in considerable difficulties for the Germans, but Nivelle refused because Petain's offensive would delay Nivelle's offensive for two weeks. General Micheler, commander of the French Reserve Army Group, which was to exploit the expected breakthrough on the Aisne, had serious misgivings about the upcoming battle. In a letter to Nivelle on 22 March, Micheler argued that the French might not break through as quickly as Nivelle wanted, as the Germans had reserves available, and had strengthened their defenses along a key sector of the Aisne. The other commanders of the French army groups also had concerns, but Nivelle did not make any major adjustments to his plan.

Assisted by Colonel (and former Minister of War) Adolphe Messimy, Micheler communicated his worries to Prime Minister Alexandre Ribot. On 6 April, Nivelle met with Micheler, Pétain and several politicians, including President Poincaré and Minister of War Painlevé at Compiegne. The investigation made the mistake of questioning Nivelle's subordinates - the Army Group Commanders - in front of him.

Painlevé argued that the Russian Revolution meant that France shouldn't expect any major help from Russia, and that the offensive should be delayed until American forces were available and could get involved. Micheler and Petain said that they doubted the French force allocated to the attack could penetrate beyond the second line of the German defences, and suggested a more limited operation. Poincaré, summing up the discussions, said that the offensive should proceed, but that it should be halted if it failed to rupture the German front. At this point, Nivelle threatened to resign if his plan was not accepted but the politicians declared their complete confidence in him.

Thus Nivelle's plan went unchanged despite the doubts expressed by the other generals and he was under greater pressure to achieve decisive results. Prime Minister Ribot said, "Our hand has been forced: It is too late to go back".

On 4 April, during a German attack south of the Aisne, the secret plans of the French assault were captured but Nivelle did not alter his course.

=== Nivelle Offensive ===
After three postponements, the Nivelle Offensive began on 16 April 1917. It started a week after British forces had attacked near Arras. Nivelle made several declarations which improved the morale of the French troops involved: "L'heure venue! Confiance! Courage! Vive la France!". Edmonds claimed Nivelle said "The German Army will run away; they only want to be off".

Due to the fact that the preliminary bombardment against the Germans was markedly less effective than expected, and the lack of a sufficient number of French howitzers, the desired French breakthrough was not achieved on the first day of the battle.

Crown Prince Wilhelm, in his memoirs, tells of the wonderment of the German troops at these futile but heroic attacks: "The commander of a machine-gun company... described to me the overwhelming view of the battleground, on which France's best regiments were being destroyed in continually renewed, hopeless attacks". (Griffiths, p. 39)

From 16 April to 25 April, there had been 134,000 casualties. Nivelle had said there would be about 10,000. Nivelle had promised the Government that the attack would either be a success or be stopped. But obviously he did not have the same interpretation of 'success' as them; he ordered the attacks to continue. On the 19th, Minister Paul Painlevé came to see him to get the offensive stopped; but Nivelle was convinced that the attacks must continue. Gradually the whole thing had developed into the Somme-like action that all had feared. (Griffiths, p. 39)

By 20 April, the French took 20,000 prisoners and 147 guns, which was considered to be "impressive results by the standards of previous years." However, a decisive breakthrough on the Aisne had not been achieved. The offensive had led to a shell shortage in France, the French medical services broke down, and the delay of transporting French wounded from the front-line was demoralising.

By the end of its first week, the attack was stalled, and Nivelle was losing control. Micheler convinced Nivelle to reduce the scope of the offensive, with the goal now only to secure all of the Chemin des Dames and push the Germans back from Reims. Nivelle became increasingly depressed over the course of the offensive as his orders were under a great degree of scrutiny by the French government. On 29 April, Nivelle's authority was undermined by the appointment of Pétain as Chief of the General Staff, and thus the main military adviser to the government. Although the French captured parts of the Chemin des Dames on 4–5 May, this was not sufficient to "repair Nivelle's crumbling reputation."

== Dismissal ==
By the time the Nivelle offensive had ended on 9 May 1917 the French had sustained 187,000 casualties. Although this was far fewer than the casualties in the Battle of Verdun, Nivelle had predicted a great success, and the country expressed bitter disappointment. Pétain became Commander-in-Chief in Nivelle's place on 15 May. In December 1917 Nivelle was transferred by the French Government to the post of Commander-in-Chief of the French Army in North Africa, an appointment which effectively removed him from direct involvement in the war. He returned to France on the war's conclusion in November 1918, retiring from the French Army in 1921. He was awarded the Grand Cross of the Legion of Honour and the Military Medal. Nivelle died on 22 March 1924, his body was buried at Les Invalides in Paris.

== Legacy ==
The British Official Historian wrote that the attempt at breakthrough had failed but that the French had gained 'considerable advantages'. "By the 20th of April they had in their hands over 20,000 prisoners and 147 guns; the railway from Soissons to Reims was freed, the enemy had been driven out of the Aisne valley west of the Oise—Aisne Canal; the German second position had been captured south of Juvincourt; and in Champagne some of the most important 'monts' had been taken. The German counter-attacks, successful at the beginning, were becoming less and less so as time went on. In particular, a great effort made on the 19th against the Fourth Army, when three divisions were thrown in between Nauroy and Moronvilliers, failed completely."

Other historians have been less generous about Nivelle's actions during the First World War. Julian Thompson contends that Nivelle was "careless of casualties," that he was a "disastrous choice to succeed Joffre as commander-in-chief," and that the planning for the Nivelle Offensive was "slapdash". In the book World War 1: 1914–1918, the execution of the Nivelle Offensive is considered to have been "murderous." David Stevenson says that the attack on the Chemin des Dames was a "disaster".

Nivelle is also considered positively in some ways. In The Macmillan Dictionary of the First World War, he is described as "a competent tactician as a regimental colonel in 1914", that his creeping barrage tactics were "innovative", and that he was able to galvanize "increasingly pessimistic public opinion in France" in December 1916". J Rickard believes Nivelle's push for a greater development of the tank contributed to its improvement by 1918, and he also says that Nivelle was a "gifted artilleryman".

Some historians blame the Nivelle Offensive for starting the French army mutinies of 1917. Tim Travers states that "the heavy French casualties of the Nivelle offensive resulted in French army mutinies", and David Stevenson proposes that "the Nivelle offensive-or more precisely the decision to persist with it-precipitated the French mutinies of May and June [1917]".

Mount Nivelle on the Continental Divide in the Canadian Rockies was named for him in 1918; summits with the names of other French generals are nearby: Cordonnier, Foch, Joffre, and Mangin.

== Decorations ==
- Légion d'honneur
  - Knight (9 July 1895)
  - Officer (21 December 1912)
  - Commander (10 April 1915)
  - Grand Officer (13 September 1916)
  - Grand Cross (28 December 1920)
- Médaille militaire (30 December 1921)
- Croix de guerre 1914–1918 with 3 palms
- Médaille Interalliée de la Victoire
- 1901 China expedition commemorative medal
- Médaille commémorative du Maroc with "Oudjda" and "Haut-Guir" clasps
- Médaille commémorative de la guerre 1914–1918
- Grand Cordon of the Order of Leopold (Belgium)
- Croix de guerre (Belgium)
- Officer of the Nicham Iftikhar (Tunisia)
- Distinguished Service Medal (US)

=== Other honours ===
In 1993, botanists published Nivellea nivellei (Braun-Blanq. & Maire) B.H.Wilcox, K.Bremer & Humphries, a flowering plant from Morocco, belonging to the family Asteraceae, with the two names in his honour.

== See also ==
- Battle of Verdun
- Nivelle Offensive
- Second Battle of the Aisne
- Philippe Pétain
- Chemin des Dames
