= Mount Nivelle =

Mountain in British Columbia, Canada

- Location within British Columbia

Highest point
- Elevation: 3,256 m (10,682 ft)
- Prominence: 334 m (1,096 ft)
- Parent peak: Joffre (3433 m)
- Listing: Mountains of British Columbia
- Coordinates: 50°31′07″N 115°10′29″W

Geography
- Country: Canada
- Province: British Columbia
- District: Kootenay
- Parent range: Park Ranges
- Topo map: NTS 82J11 Kananaskis Lakes

Climbing
- First ascent: 1928 by J.W.A. Hickson, guided by Edward Feuz Jr.

Mount Nivelle is a mountain located at the NW end of Elk Lakes Provincial Park in British Columbia, Canada. It was named in 1918 after Marshal Robert Nivelle, and is one of the series of mountains there named after French generals of the First World War, including Cordonnier, Foch, Joffre, Mangin, Sarrail, and (until recent removal) Pétain.
