= Nivellea =

Scientific classification
- Kingdom: Plantae
- Clade: Tracheophytes
- Clade: Angiosperms
- Clade: Eudicots
- Clade: Asterids
- Order: Asterales
- Family: Asteraceae
- Subfamily: Asteroideae
- Tribe: Anthemideae
- Genus: Nivellea; B.H.Wilcox, K.Bremer & Humphries
- Species: N. nivellei

Binomial name
- Nivellea nivellei (Braun-Blanq. & Maire) B.H.Wilcox, K.Bremer & Humphries

Synonyms
- Chrysanthemum nivellei Braun-Blanq. & Maire

Genus of plants

Nivellea is a monotypic genus of flowering plants belonging to the family Asteraceae. The only species is Nivellea nivellei.

It is native to Morocco.

The genus name of Nivellea is in honour of Robert Nivelle (1856–1924), a French artillery general officer who served in the Boxer Rebellion, and the First World War. The Latin specific epithet of nivellei also refers to Robert Nivelle. Both the genus and the species were first described and published in Bull. Nat. Hist. Mus. (London), Bot. Vol.23 on page 140 in 1993.
