= Calais Conference (1917) =

UK/France WWI diplomatic conference

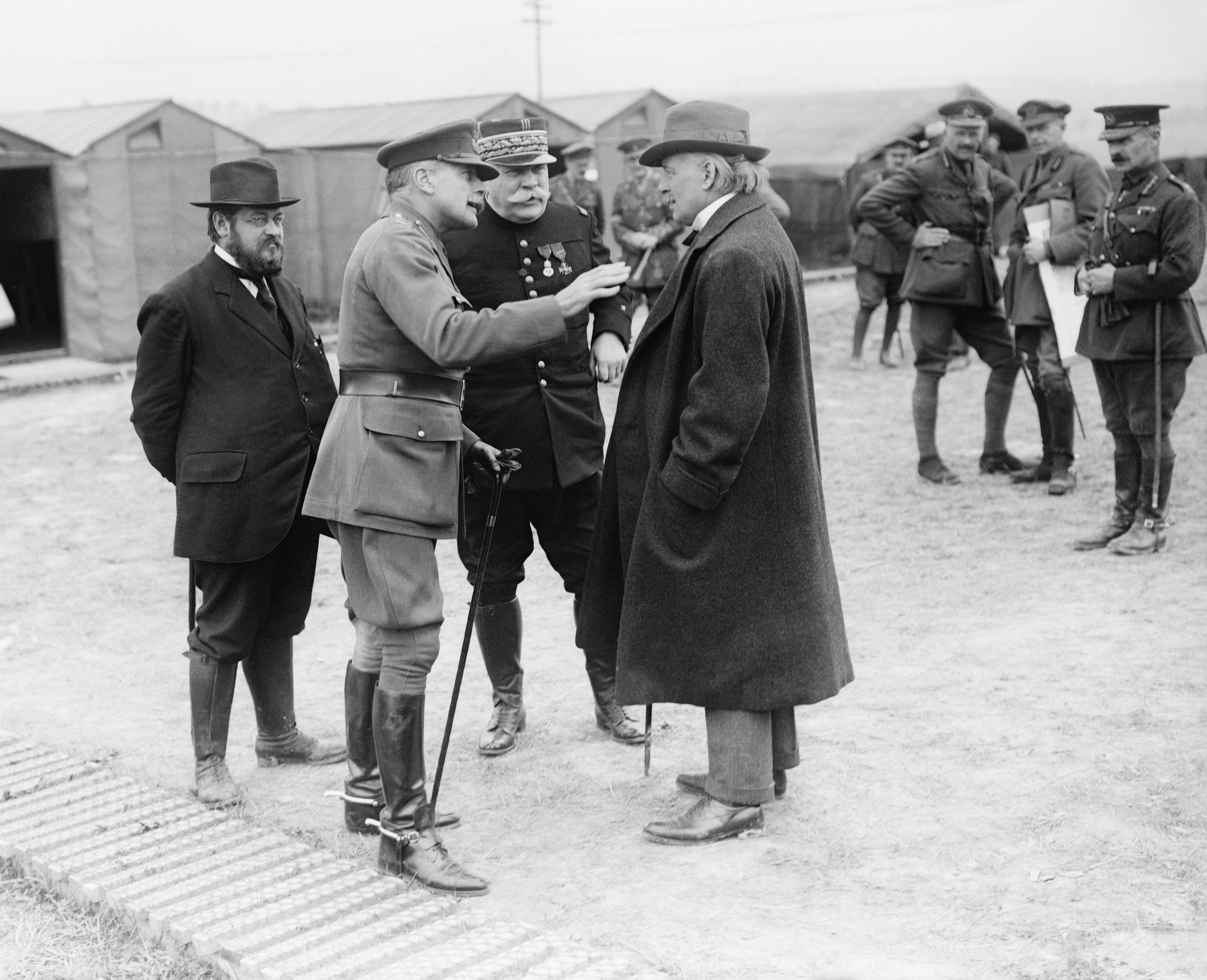
General Sir Douglas Haig (second left) in discussion with Lloyd George in 1916.

The Calais Conference was a 26 February 1917 meeting of politicians and generals from France and the United Kingdom. Ostensibly about railway logistics for the upcoming allied Spring offensive the majority of the conference was given over to a plan to bring British forces under overall French command. The British Prime Minister David Lloyd George was supportive of the proposal and arranged for the British war cabinet to approve it in advance of the conference, without the knowledge of senior British generals Douglas Haig and Sir William Robertson. The latter were surprised when the proposal was presented by French General Robert Nivelle at the conference. The next day the two generals met with Lloyd George and threatened their resignations rather than implement the proposal. This led to the significant watering-down of the plan with greater freedom given to British commanders. The conference caused mistrust between the British civil and military chiefs and set back the cause of a unified allied command until Spring 1918, when the successful German spring offensive rendered it essential.

== Background ==
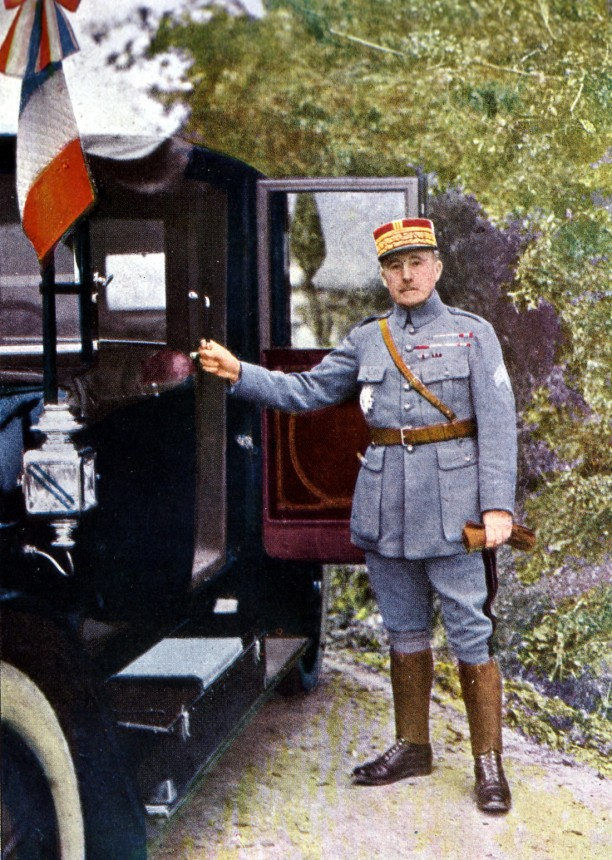
General Nivelle in 1916

The conference of senior British and French political and military figures was arranged for 26 February 1917 to resolve issues in the co-ordination of railway logistics between the two armies in the lead up to a proposed Spring offensive. However, British Prime Minister David Lloyd George intended to use the opportunity to attempt to resolve what he saw as a lack of co-operation between the two armies. He had been persuaded of the need for this by French General Robert Nivelle during his visit to London in December 1916. Nivelle regarded British Field Marshal Douglas Haig's 1916 offensives (which included the Battle of the Somme) as wasteful and wished to bring both armies under a single command structure. Lloyd George, who was himself doubtful of Haig's competence, agreed with this view and set in place plans to bring the British Army under an overall French senior commander. The British Prime Minister had, in 1916, canvassed French General Ferdinand Foch for critical views of Haig and his superior Field Marshal Sir John French.

Lloyd George arranged for the war cabinet to meet without the government military adviser Sir William Robertson – a close ally of Haig - and the proposal was agreed. The cabinet's secretary, Maurice Hankey recalled that the plans "took my breath away".

== Conference ==
The conference was attended by Lloyd George, Haig, Robertson, Nivelle, French Prime Minister Aristide Briand and French War Minister Hubert Lyautey. Railway logisticians attended the first part of the meeting but were quickly dismissed to allow the talks to turn to the question of command. Just prior to the conference Lloyd George had spent half an hour in private discussion with Briand in which he stated that he was willing for the British Expeditionary Force (BEF, the British Army in France and Belgium) to come under French command.

Nivelle had been briefed to openly criticise Haig during the conference for his alleged failure to attack in support of French offensives. This gave Lloyd George an opening to request that Nivelle draw up proposals, for presentation later that evening, to improve the situation. Nivelle's plan would have brought operational, supply and administrative control of the BEF under French command from 1 March. There would have been no direct liaison between British commanders and their government, with all communications being via the French commander-in-chief. Haig would have been effectively supplanted as commander of British forces by a British chief of staff reporting to Nivelle. His role would have been reduced to that of following the orders of his superior and for administering army discipline which, for legal reasons, had to remain in British hands. The surprise revelation is said to have left Haig speechless and Robertson showing signs of having a fit. At the conclusion of the conference Haig signed his copy of the plans with the caveat "signed by me as a correct statement but not as approving the arrangement".

== Subsequent events ==
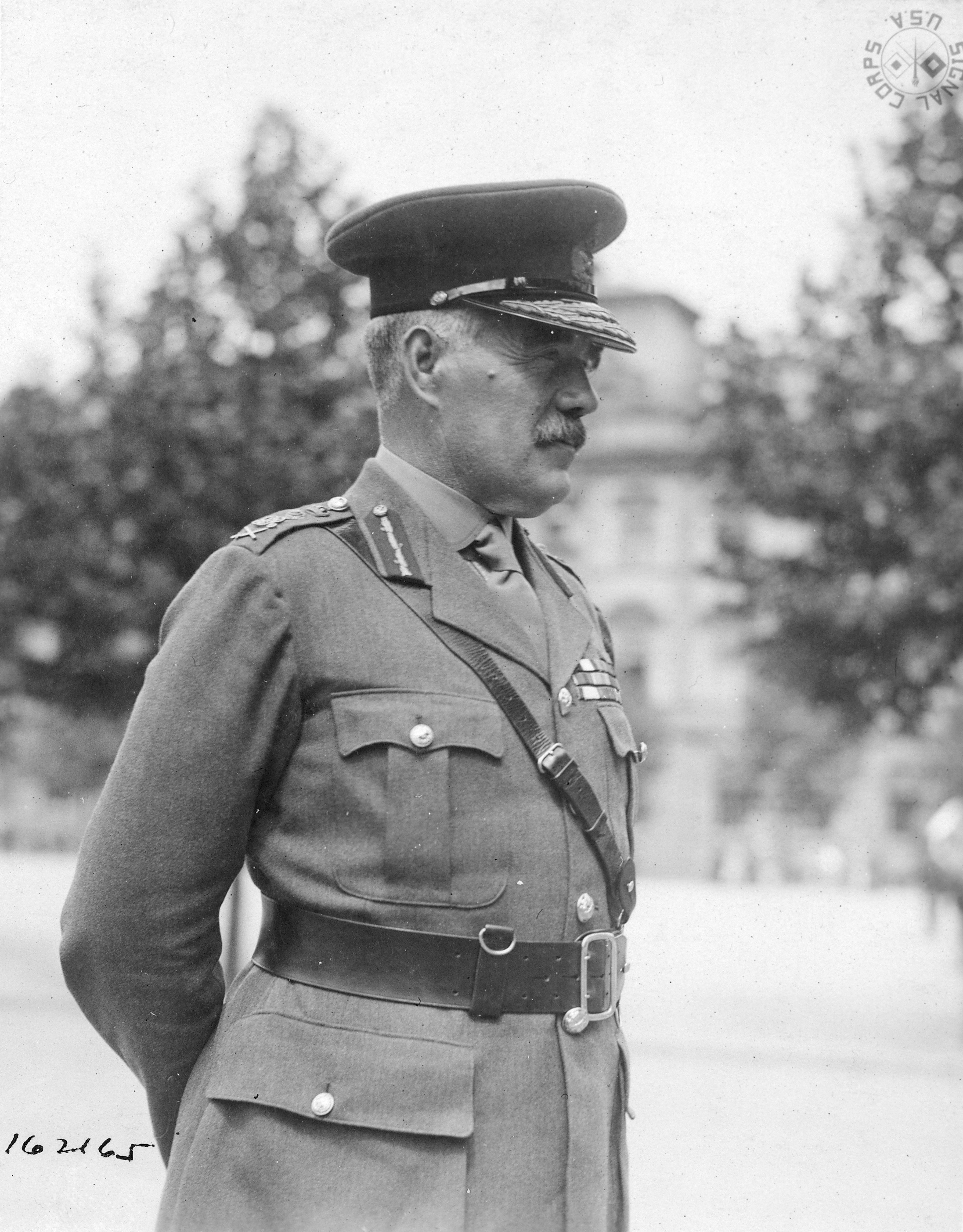
General Robertson

The next morning Lloyd George met with Haig and Robertson. He revealed to them that he had been aware of the plans and that they had already been approved by the war cabinet. Lloyd George instructed the generals to draw up a blueprint to implement the proposals by the next day. Haig and Robertson stated that the proposals would result in humiliation for the British Army and declared that they would prefer to be court martialled for disobeying orders rather than implement them. The two men threatened their resignations over the plans, an act which later caused Lloyd George to back down and allow concessions over the arrangement. Later that day Robertson confronted Nivelle over the plans. Nivelle claimed to have been surprised that Lloyd George had not consulted with the British generals before allowing the French to make their proposals.

A follow-up conference in London led to the agreement of a watered-down version of the proposals with British troops only to follow the orders of their own commanders and for all communication from French forces to come via Haig. Haig would also have full freedom as to how to implement any orders from the French and have the right to appeal to the British government if he disagreed with them. The arrangement was set to expire at the conclusion of the Spring offensive.

The blunt approach taken during the Calais Conference led to significant mistrust between the British generals and politicians and strained their working relationship to breaking point. The event led to significant set-backs in the implementation of a unified command for allied forces on the Western Front. This system, with General Foch appointed généralissime (commander-in-chief) of allied forces, was finally implemented as a response to significant German gains during the 1918 Spring Offensive.
