= Mount Pétain =

Mountain in Canada, formerly Mount Pétain

Unnamed Alberta–BC mountain
- Mount Pétain (1919–2022)
- Location within Alberta Location within British Columbia Location within Canada
- Interactive map of Mount Pétain

Highest point
- Elevation: 3,196 m (10,486 ft)
- Prominence: 326 m (1,070 ft)
- Listing: Mountains of Alberta; Mountains of British Columbia
- Coordinates: 50°32′39″N 115°11′07″W

Geography
- Country: Canada
- Provinces: Alberta and British Columbia
- Parent range: Park Ranges
- Topo map: NTS 82J11 Kananaskis Lakes

Climbing
- First ascent: 1930 Katie Gardiner, Walter Fuez

A mountain formerly known as Mount Pétain, but with no current official name, is located on the border of the Canadian provinces of Alberta and British Columbia (BC) on the Continental Divide.

== Original nomenclature ==
It was named in 1918 after French Marshal Philippe Pétain, who was then an honoured war hero for the Allies of World War I. Pétain's reputation changed after he was Head of State of Vichy France, where he was partly responsible for the murder of 76,000 Jews.

Besides the mountain several other geographical points were named for Pétain. Pétain Glacier is found next to Mount Joffre and Mount Pétain forming the Pétain Basin, with melt cascading down Pétain Creek Falls into the Pétain Creek below.

== Renaming ==
In 2019, the Government of Alberta rescinded Pétain's name from the Alberta side of the border. In October 2021, the Regional District of East Kootenay, upon being consulted by BC Geographical Names, voted to support removing Pétain's name from the British Columbia side. On June 29, 2022, the Government of British Columbia also rescinded the name, rendering the mountain officially nameless. The names of Pétain Creek and Pétain Glacier were also rescinded.

As of July 2022, neither of the provinces in which the mountain sits have decided on a new name, but "will work together" with local stakeholders to determine one.

== Access ==
The snow-capped mountain can be reached from Height of the Rockies Provincial Park and Elk Lakes Provincial Park within British Columbia or Peter Lougheed Provincial Park in Alberta.

== See also ==
- List of peaks on the Alberta–British Columbia border
- List of Nazi monuments in Canada
