= Mount Cordonnier =

Mountain on Alberta/British Columbia border in Canada

- Location within Alberta Location within British Columbia Location within Canada

Highest point
- Elevation: 3,012 m (9,882 ft) (Note: Other sources state 3021 m.)
- Prominence: 177 m (581 ft) (Note: Based on a summit elevation of 3012 m.)
- Parent peak: Mount Mangin (3065 m)
- Listing: Mountains of Alberta; Mountains of British Columbia
- Coordinates: 50°32′59″N 115°13′56″W

Geography
- Country: Canada
- Provinces: Alberta and British Columbia
- Topo map: NTS 82J11 Kananaskis Lakes

Climbing
- First ascent: 1930 Kate Gardiner, guided by Walter Fuez
- Easiest route: Scramble routes

Mount Cordonnier is located north of Mount Joffre in Height of the Rockies Provincial Park and straddles the Continental Divide marking the Alberta-British Columbia border. It was named in 1918 after General Victor Louis Emilien Cordonnier.

== See also ==
- List of mountains in the Canadian Rockies
- List of peaks on the Alberta–British Columbia border
