= Mount Mangin =

Mountain on Alberta/British Columbia boundary in Canada

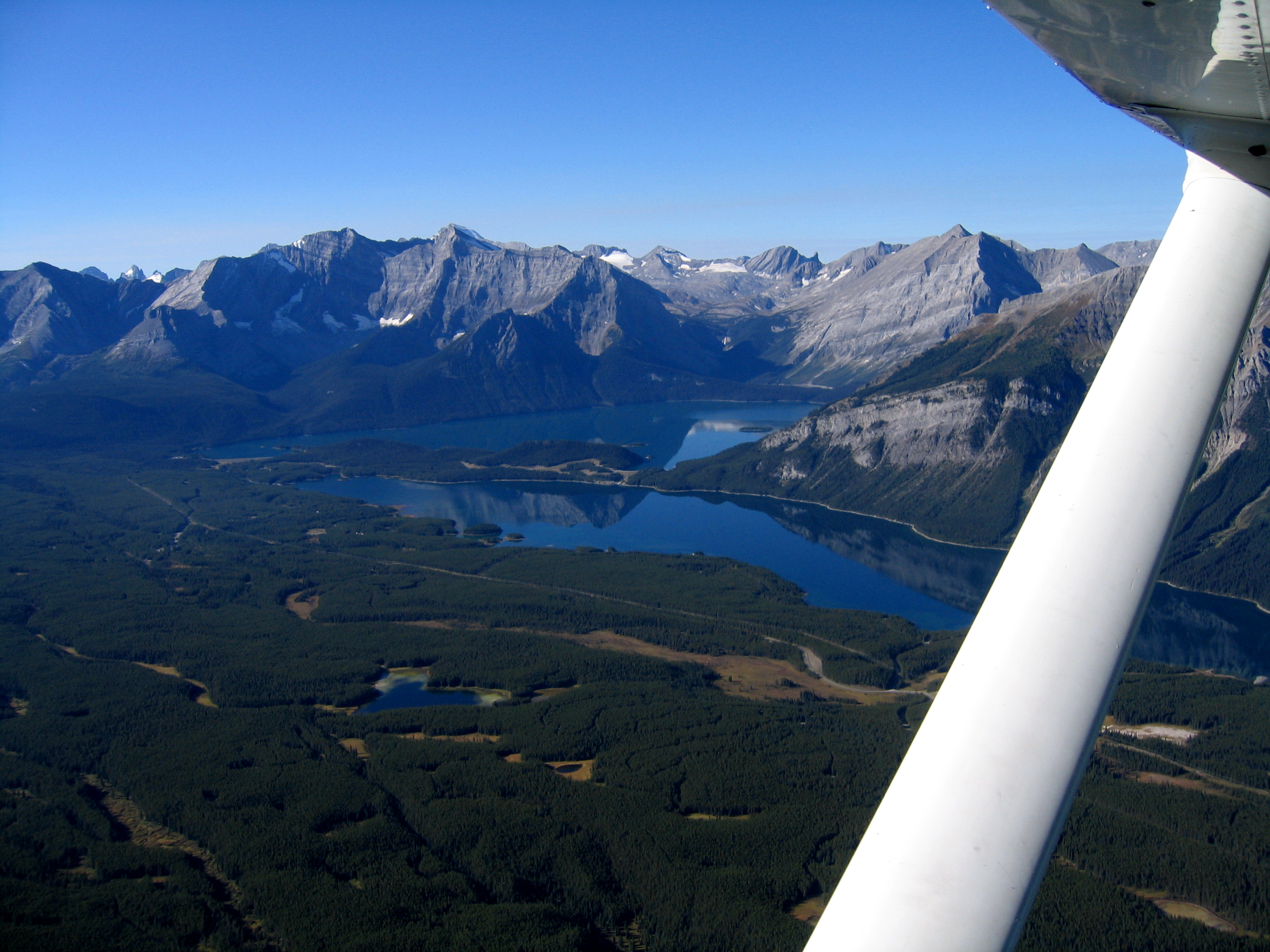
- Mt. Mangin is right of centre

Highest point
- Elevation: 3,057 m (10,030 ft)
- Prominence: 125 m (410 ft)
- Parent peak: Mount Joffre (3433 m)
- Listing: Mountains of Alberta; Mountains of British Columbia
- Coordinates: 50°32′29″N 115°13′33″W

Geography
- Location within Alberta Location within British Columbia Location within Canada
- Country: Canada
- Provinces: Alberta and British Columbia
- Parent range: Park Ranges
- Topo map: NTS 82J11 Kananaskis Lakes

Climbing
- First ascent: 1928 J.W.A. Hickson, Edward Fuez Jr.

Mount Mangin is located on the border of Alberta and British Columbia on the Continental Divide. It was named in 1918 after French general Charles Mangin.

== See also ==
- List of mountains in the Canadian Rockies
- List of peaks on the Alberta–British Columbia border
