= Mount Joffre =

Mountain in Alberta/B.C., Canada

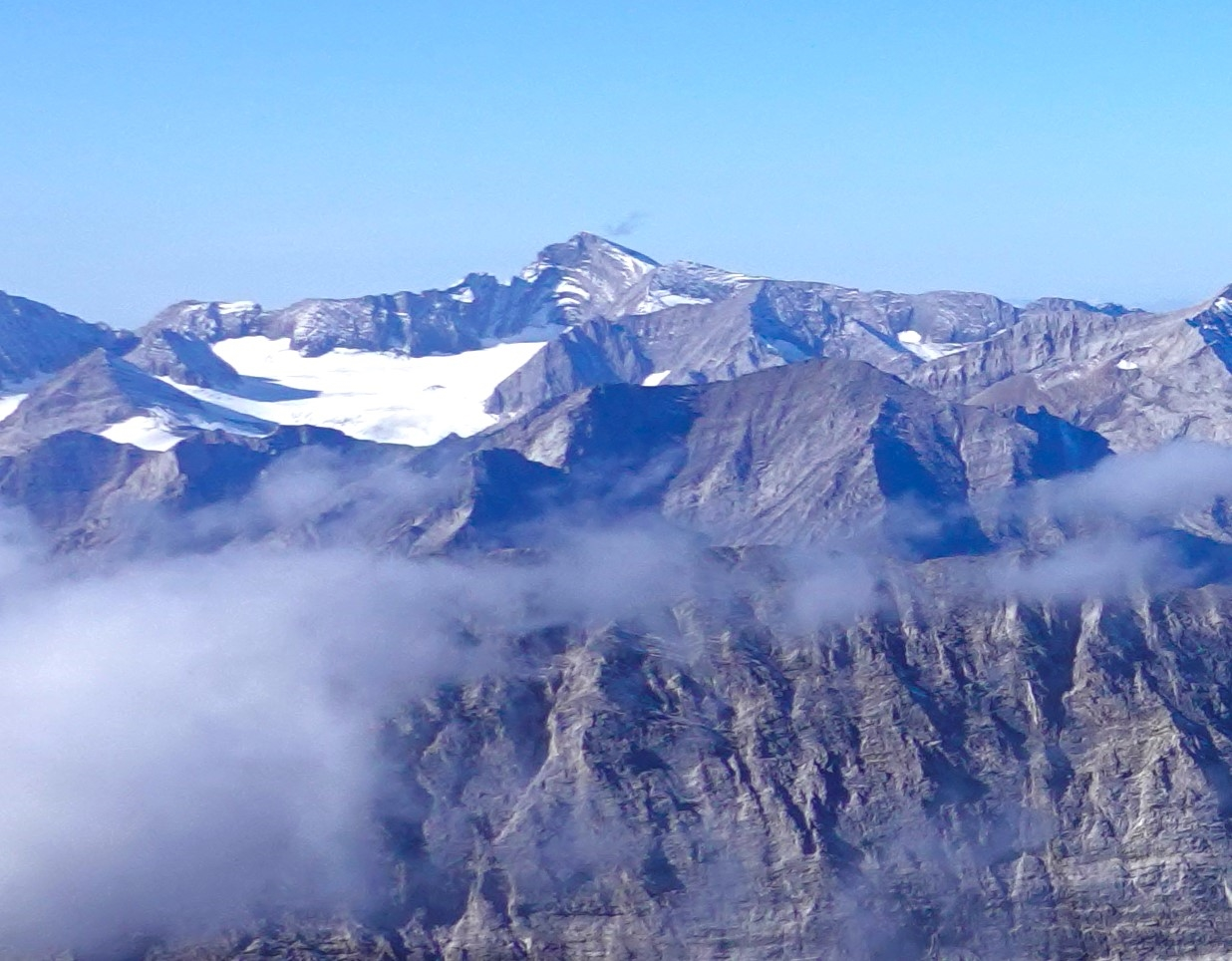
- Mount Joffre in the distance

Highest point
- Elevation: 3,450 m (11,320 ft)
- Prominence: 1,505 m (4,938 ft)
- Parent peak: Mount Assiniboine (3616 m)
- Listing: Mountains of Alberta; Mountains of British Columbia; Canada highest major peaks 43rd; Canada prominent peaks 139th
- Coordinates: 50°31′41″N 115°12′24″W

Geography
- Location within Alberta Location within British Columbia Location within Canada
- Country: Canada
- Provinces: Alberta; British Columbia
- Parent range: Elk Range, Canadian Rockies
- Topo map: NTS 82J11 Kananaskis Lakes

Climbing
- First ascent: 1919 by Joseph Hickson, guided by Edward Feuz jr.
- Easiest route: rock/snow climb

Mount Joffre is a mountain located on the Continental Divide, in Peter Lougheed Provincial Park, Alberta, and Elk Lakes and Height of the Rockies Provincial Parks in British Columbia. The mountain was named in 1918 by the Interprovincial Boundary Survey after Marshal Joseph Joffre, commander-in-chief of the French Army during World War I.

The normal climbing route (UIAA class II) is via the north face, which is covered by the Mangin Glacier.

== See also ==
- List of mountain peaks of North America
- List of mountains in the Canadian Rockies
