= French Army in World War I =

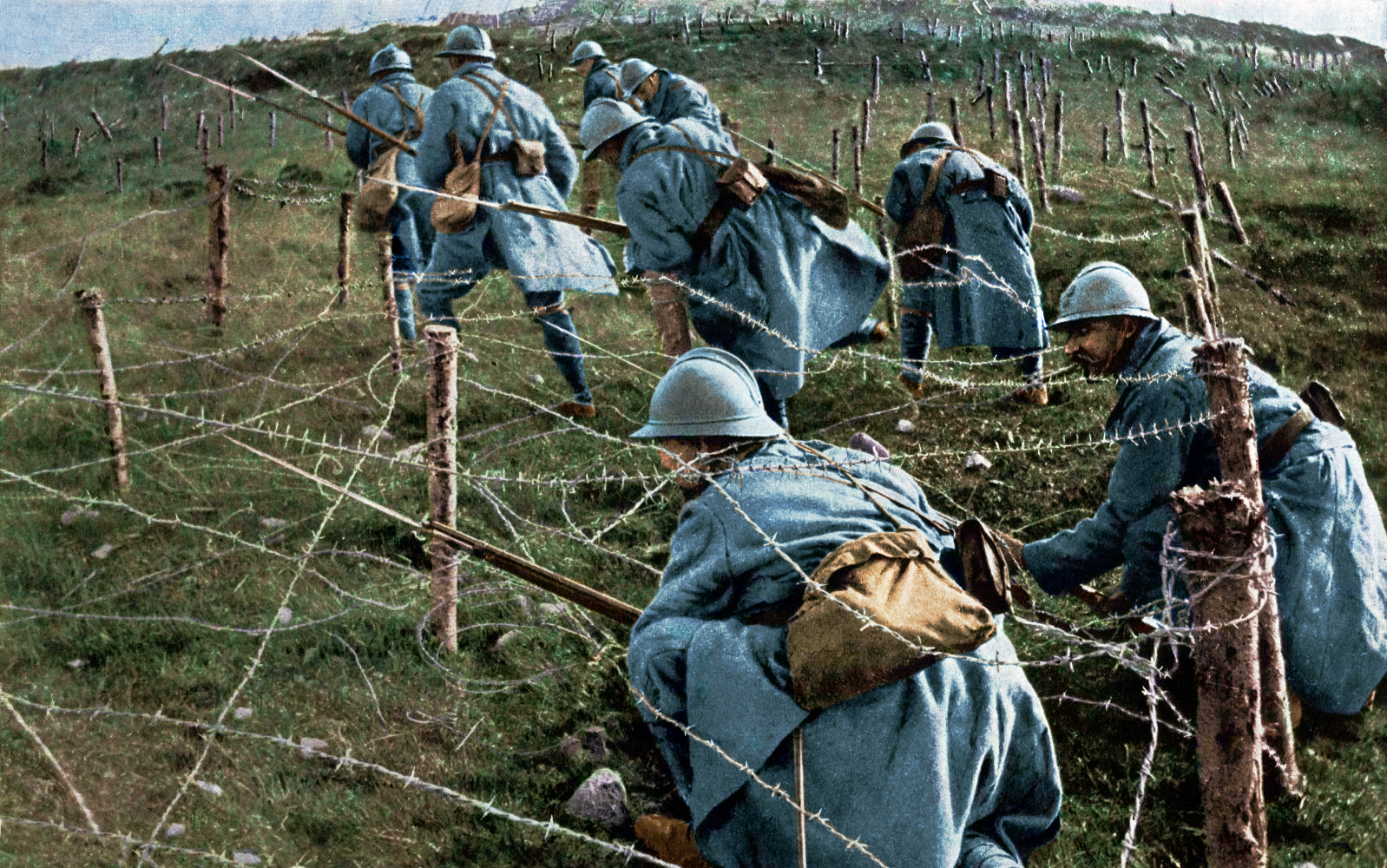
French infantry pushing through enemy barbed wire, 1915

During World War I, France was one of the Triple Entente powers allied against the Central Powers. Although fighting occurred worldwide, the bulk of the French Army's operations occurred in Belgium, Luxembourg, France and Alsace-Lorraine along what came to be known as the Western Front, which consisted mainly of trench warfare. During the four-year conflict, French forces inflicted nearly three million casualties on the German Army, more than any other Allied army.

In the early periods of the conflict, the French Army was neither as strong numerically nor as well endowed with heavy guns as the German Army was.

By the later stages of the war, the French Army had been described as “the most modern army in the world,” as it fielded the most tanks and airplanes of any Allied army, vast parks of heavy artillery employing barrage tactics, and modern infantry specialists skilled in fire-and-movement tactics in cooperation with the supporting arms.

France had experienced nearly 1.4 million men killed or missing in action, and another four million had been wounded. Yet, after so much effort and sacrifice, and despite the staggering human cost, French families continued to send their sons into the army. Of those conscripted, the share of young men refusing to serve declined from 2.59 percent in 1915, to 1.08 percent in 1916, to 0.88 percent in 1918. France, which began the war with an antiquated industrial base, went on to become the arsenal of the Entente. With production rates continuously increasing, French industry supplied weapons or munitions to all the allies at one time or another, but it provided the Americans the most—more than three-quarters of all the tanks, field artillery, and airplanes used by the Doughboys in France.

== Background ==
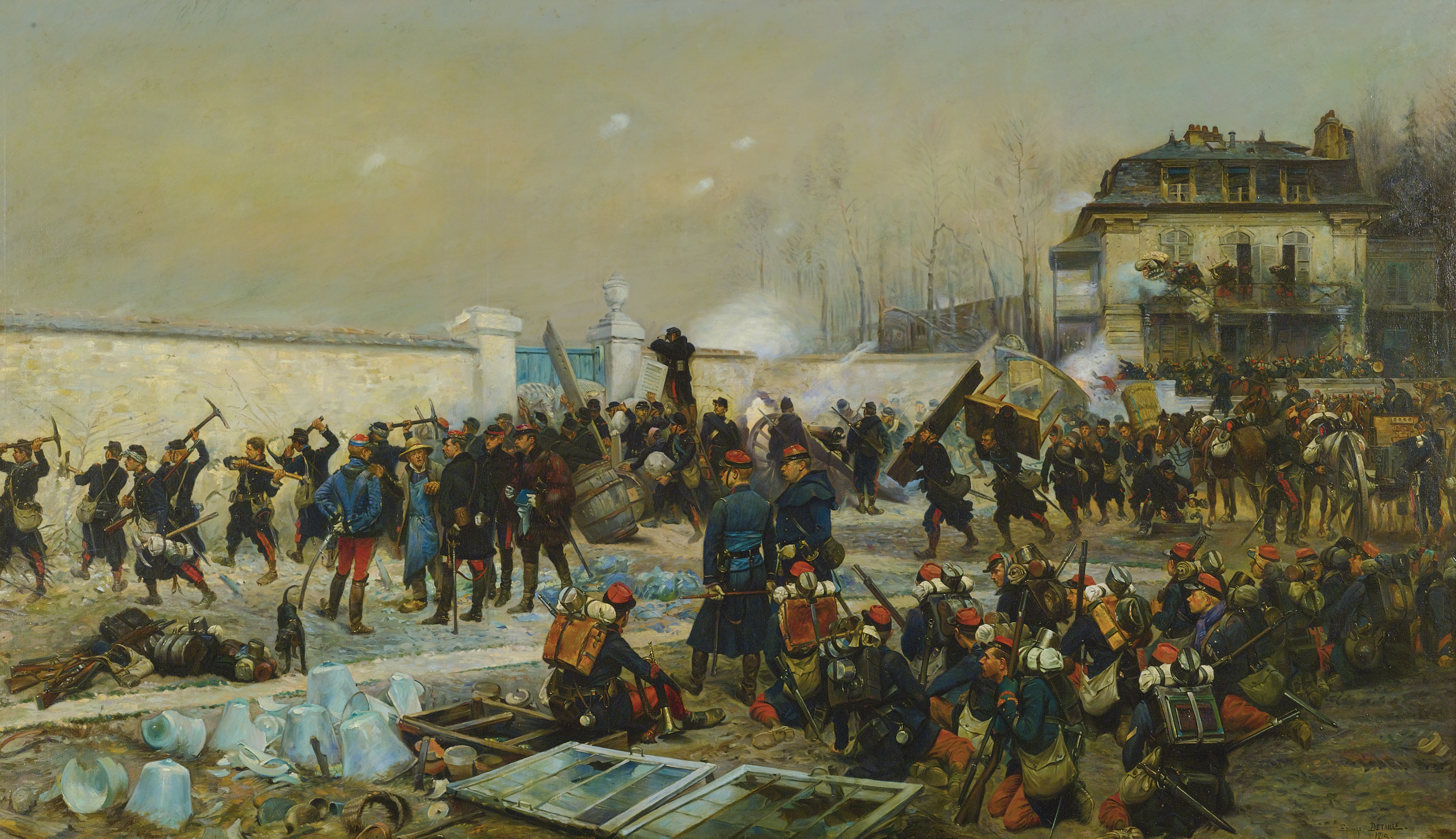
French army during the Franco-Prussian War of 1870–71

France had been the major power in Europe for most of the Early Modern Era: Louis XIV, in the seventeenth century, and Napoleon I in the nineteenth, had extended French power over most of Europe through skillful diplomacy and military prowess. The Treaty of Vienna in 1815 confirmed France as a European power broker. By the early 1850s, Prussian Chancellor Otto von Bismarck started a system of alliances designed to assert Prussian dominance over Central Europe. Bismarck's diplomatic maneuvering, and France's maladroit response to such crises as the Ems Dispatch and the Hohenzollern Candidature led to the French declaration of war in 1870. France's subsequent defeat in the Franco-Prussian War, including the loss of its army and the capture of its emperor at Sedan, the loss of territory, including Alsace-Lorraine, and the payment of heavy indemnities, left the French seething and placed the reacquisition of lost territory as a primary goal at the end of the 19th century; the defeat also ended French preeminence in Europe. Following German Unification (1871), Bismarck attempted to isolate France diplomatically by befriending Austria-Hungary, Russia, Britain, and Italy.

After 1870, the European powers began gaining settlements in Africa, with colonialism on that continent hitting its peak between 1895 and 1905 (Scramble for Africa). However, colonial disputes were only a minor cause of World War I, as most had been settled by 1914. Economic rivalry was not only a source for some of the colonial conflicts but also a minor cause for the start of World War I. For France, the rivalry was mostly with the rapidly industrializing Germany, which had seized the coal-rich region of Alsace-Lorraine in 1870, and later struggled with France over mineral-rich Morocco.

Another cause of World War I was growing militarism which led to an arms race between the powers. As a result of the arms race, all European powers were ready for war and had time tables that would send millions of reserves into combat in a matter of days.

France was bound by treaty to defend Russia (Franco-Russian Alliance). Austria-Hungary had declared war on Serbia due to the Black Hand's assassination of Archduke Ferdinand, which used it as a pretext for a war with Serbia that many in the Austrian and Hungarian governments had long advocated. France was brought into the war by a German declaration of war on 3 August 1914.

== The pre-war army and mobilization ==
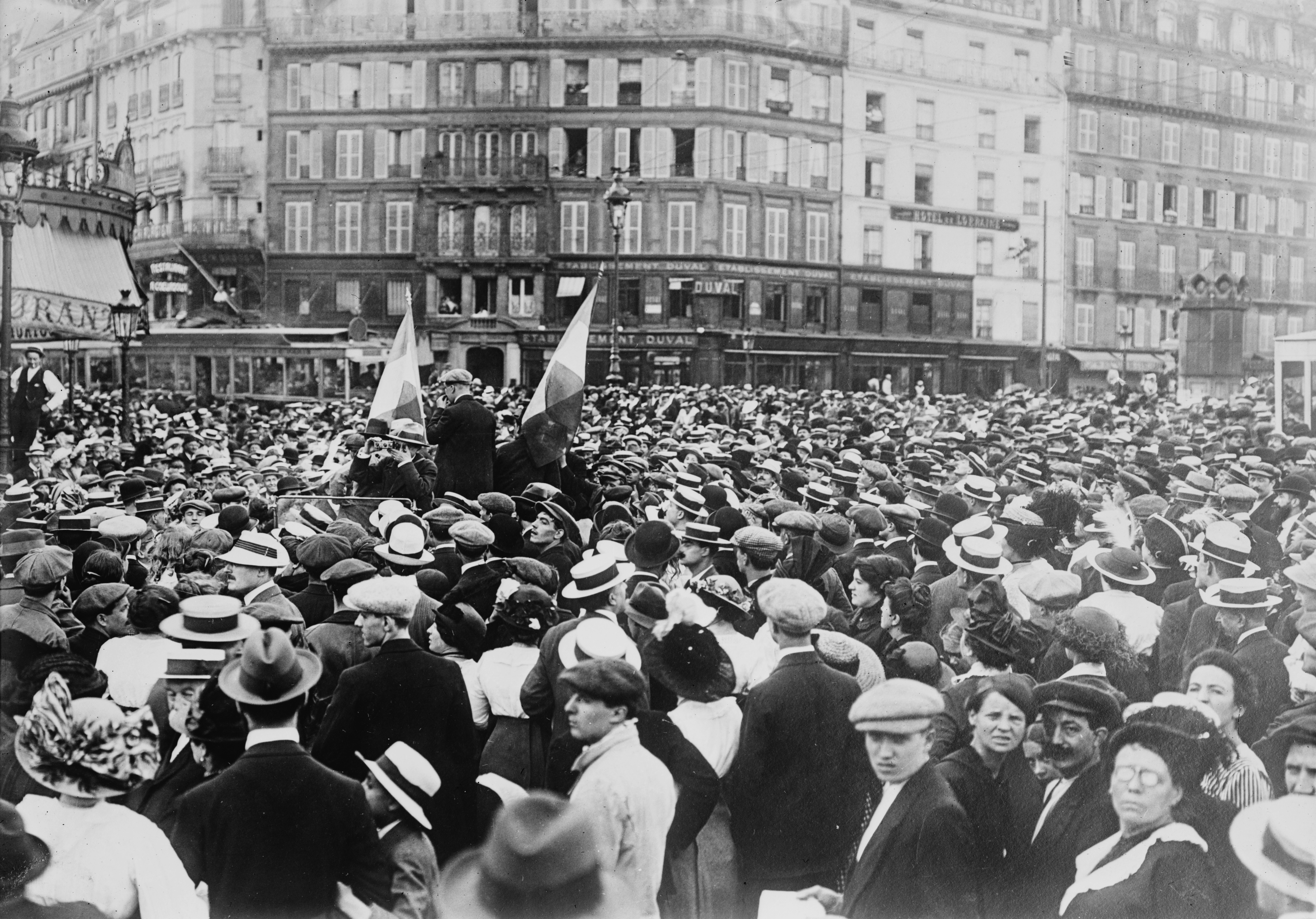
Photograph shows reservists and crowd at the Gare de Paris-Est, Paris during the beginning of World War I

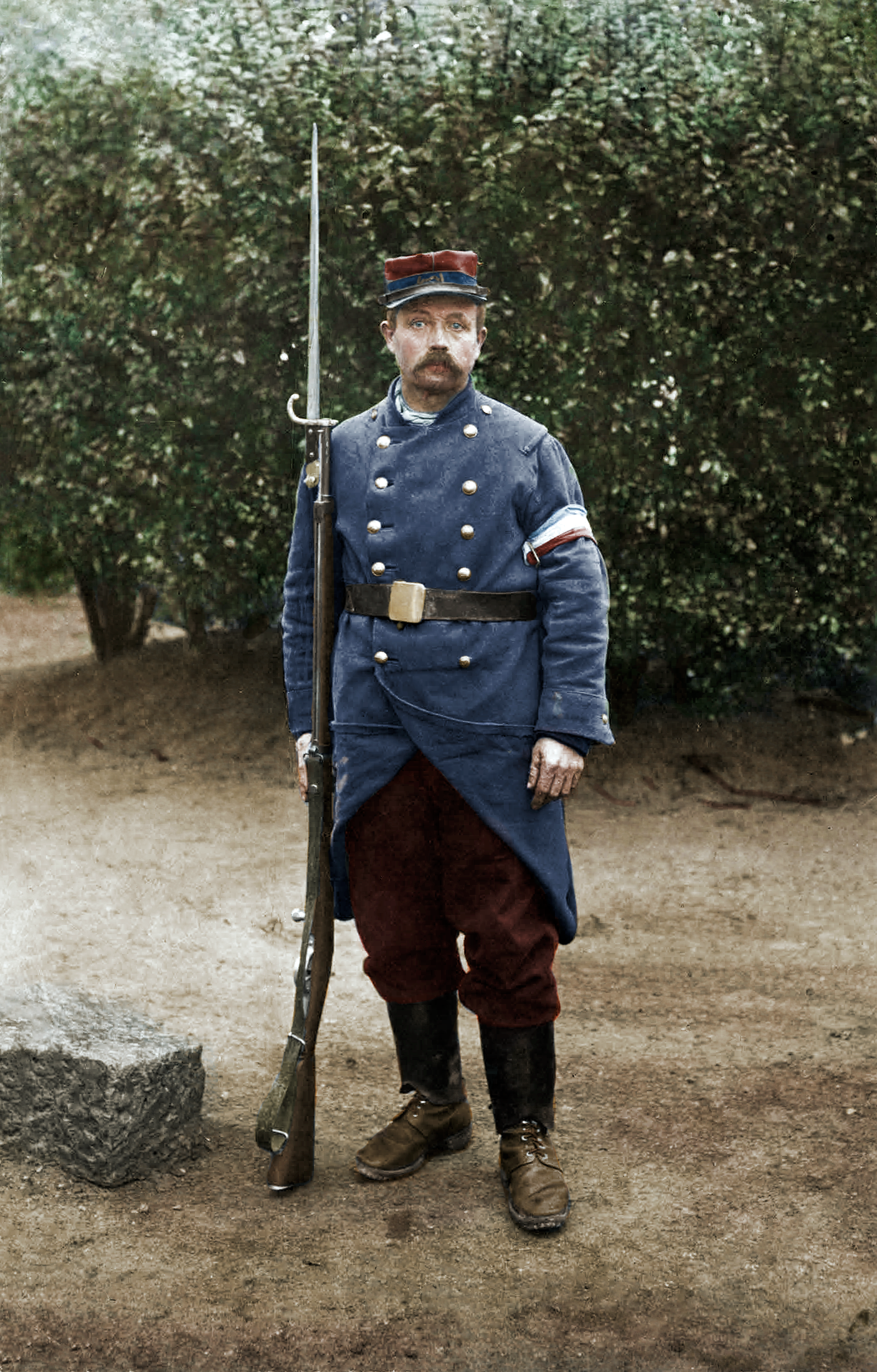
Colorized photograph of an infantryman drafted in August 1914, note the red trousers still in use.

In common with most other continental European powers, the French Army was organized on the basis of universal conscription. Each year, the "class" of men turning twenty in the upcoming year would be inducted into the French Army and spend three years in active service. After leaving active service they would progress through various stages of reserves, each of which involved a lower degree of commitment.

- Active Army (20–23)
- Reserve of the Active Army (24–34)
- Territorial Army (35–41)
- Reserve of the Territorial Army (42–48)

The peacetime army consisted of 173 infantry regiments, 79 cavalry regiments, and 87 artillery regiments. All were substantially under strength and would be filled out on mobilization by the first three classes of the Reserve (that is, men between 24 and 26). Each regiment would also leave behind a cadre of training personnel to conduct refresher courses for the older reservists, who were organized into 201 Reserve Regiments and 145 Territorial Regiments. Above the regimental level, France was divided into 22 Military Regions, each of which would become an Army Corps on mobilization.

At the apex of the French Army was the General Staff, since 1911 under the leadership of General Joseph Joffre. The General Staff was responsible for drawing up the plan for mobilization, known as Plan XVII. Using the railroad network, the Army would be shifted from their peacetime garrisons throughout France to the eastern border with Germany.

The order for mobilization was given on 1 August 1914, the same day that Germany declared war on Russia. Immediately called to their regiments were the classes of 1896 to 1910, comprising almost three million reservists of 24 to 38 years old.

== Organization during the war ==
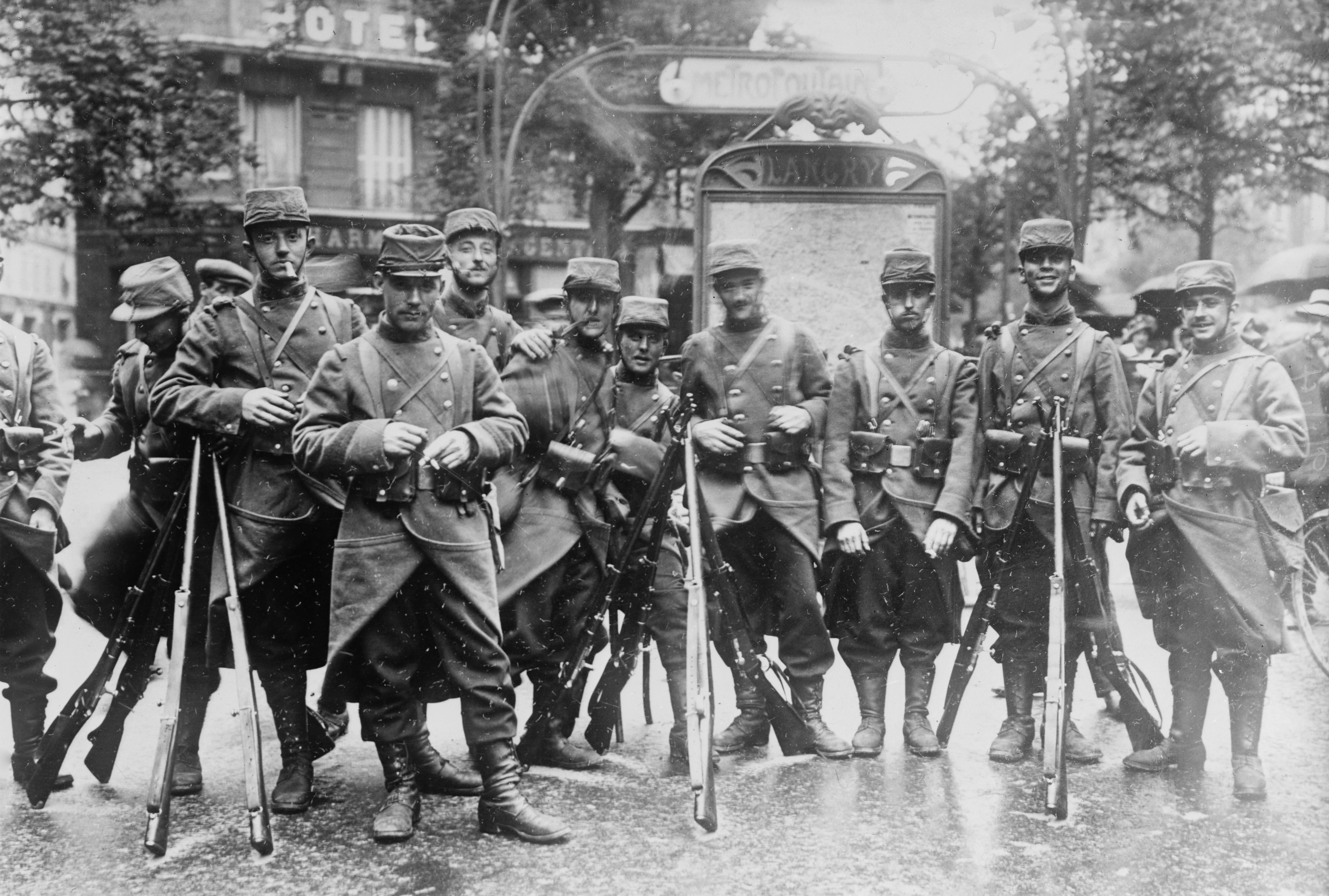
French soldiers at the beginning of World War I. They retain the peacetime blue coats and red trousers worn during the early months of the war

Obsolete map of the Schlieffen Plan and the French offensives of Plan XVII

Upon mobilization, Joffre became Commander-in-Chief of the French Army. Most of his forces were concentrated in the northeast of France, both to attack Alsace-Lorraine and to meet the expected German offensive through the Low Countries.

- First Army (7th, 8th, 13th, 14th, and 21st Army Corps), with the objective of capturing Mulhouse and Sarrebourg.
- Second Army (9th, 15th, 16th, 18th and 20th Army Corps), with the objective of capturing Morhange.
- Third Army (4th, 5th and 6th Army Corps), defending the region around Metz.
- Fourth Army (12th, 17th and Colonial Army Corps) held in reserve around the Forest of Argonne
- Fifth Army (1st, 2nd, 3rd, 10th and 11th Army Corps), defending the Ardennes.

Over the course of the First World War another five field armies would be raised. The war scare led to another 2.9 million men being mobilized in the summer of 1914 and the costly battles on the Western Front forced France to conscript men up to the age of 45. This was done by the mobilization in 1914 of the Territorial Army and its reserves, comprising men who had completed their peacetime service with the active and reserve armies (ages 20–34).

In June 1915, the Allied countries met in the first inter-Allied conference. Britain, France, Belgium, Italy, Serbia and Russia agreed to coordinate their attacks but the attempts were frustrated by German offensives on the Eastern Front and spoiling offensives at Ypres and in the hills west of Verdun.

By 1918, towards the end of the war, the composition and structure of the French army had changed. Forty percent of all French soldiers on the Western Front were operating artillery and 850,000 French troops were infantry in 1918, compared to 1.5 million in 1915. Causes for the drop in infantry include increased machine gun, armored car and tank usage, as well as the increasing significance of the French air force, the Service Aéronautique. At the end of the war on 11 November 1918, the French had called up 8,817,000 men, including 900,000 colonial troops. The French army suffered around 6 million casualties, including 1.4 million dead and 4.2 million wounded, roughly 71% of those who fought. Out of the one million French infantrymen who died in the war, more than half died between the outbreak of war and November 1915.

== Commanders-in-Chief ==
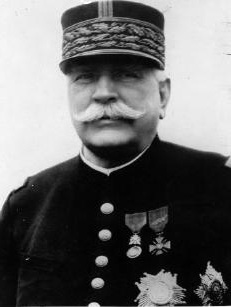
Joseph Joffre before 1918

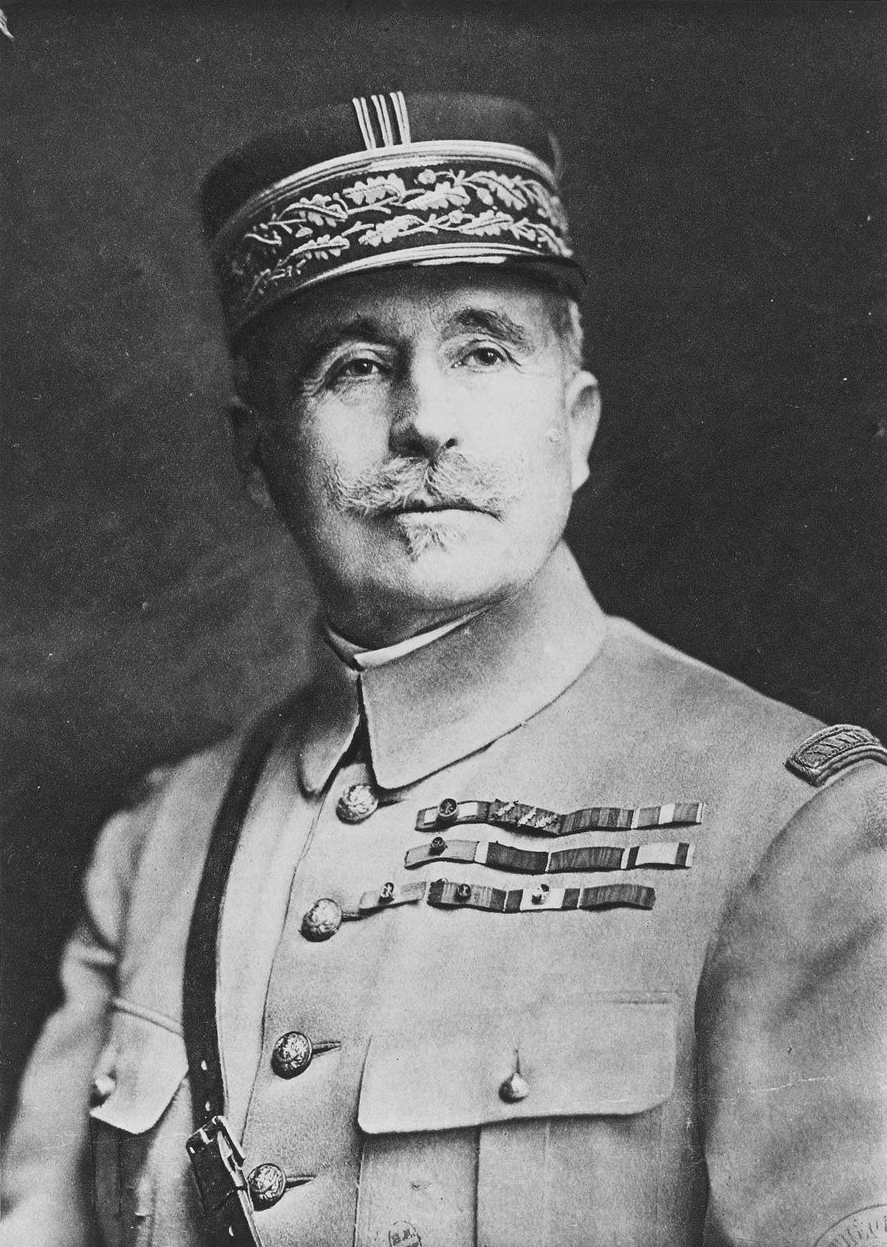
Robert Georges Nivelle in 1917

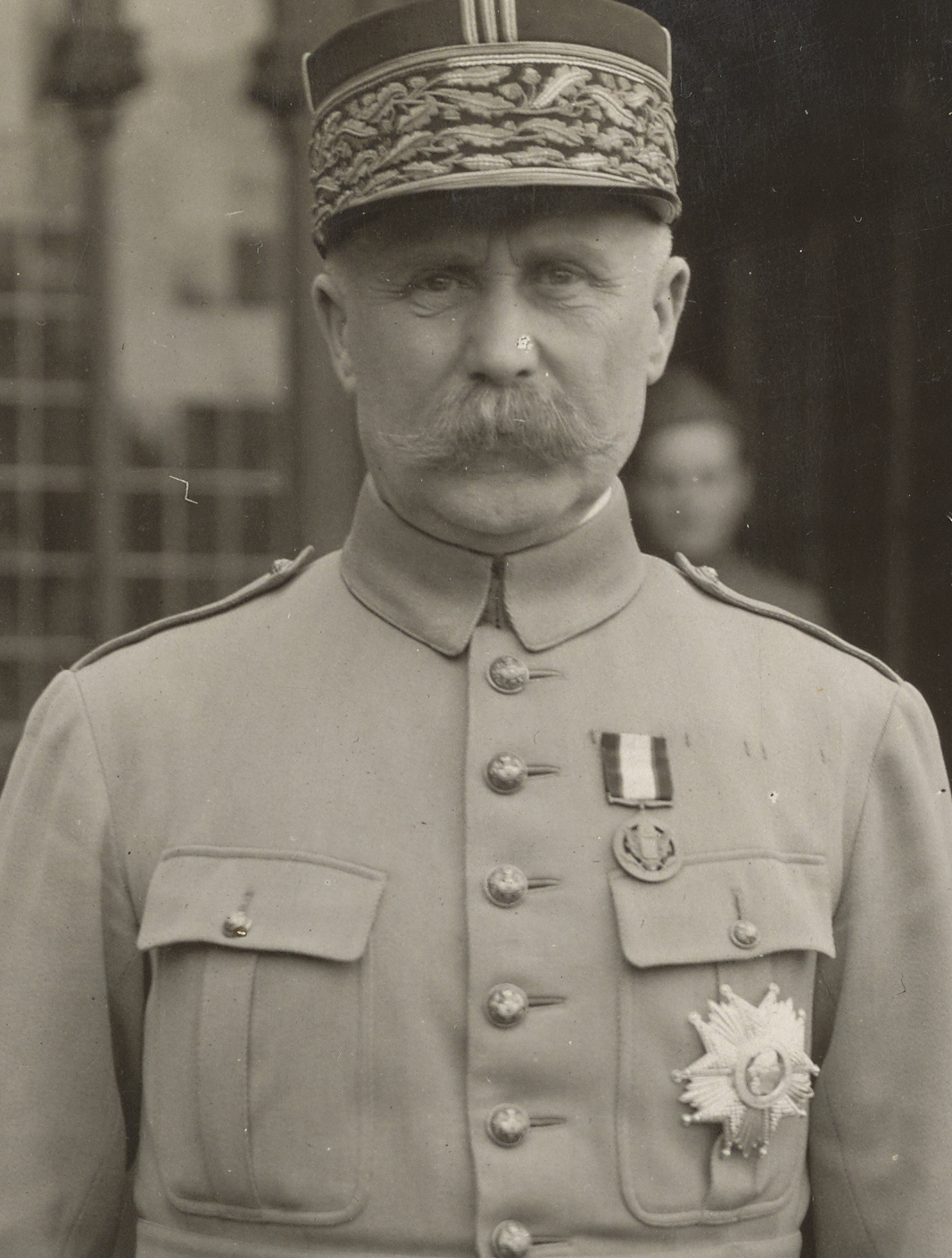
Philippe Pétain in 1919

The Chief of the General Staff and Commander-in-Chief at the time was Joseph Joffre, a former engineer officer who had served in West Africa. He was appointed in 1911 during the Agadir Crisis. He played a significant role in the development and subsequent failure of France's mobilisation and deployment plan against Germany, Plan XVII. While earning praise for his role in slowing the German advance, especially in the decisive Battle of the Marne, his refusal to accept negative news in the later months caused numerous strategic errors, leading to the loss of as many as 300 000 men in the opening months of the war. By 1915, confidence in Joffre was quickly dropping, however he was appointed generalissimo on 2 December. Following the heavy losses at the Battle of Verdun and the Somme, and the defeat of Romania, Joffre was replaced by Robert Nivelle and effectively relieved of his duties on 12 December 1916. Due to his popularity, it was not presented to the public as a dismissal and he became the first Marshal under the Third Republic.

Robert Nivelle, who began the war as a regimental colonel, was appointed Commander-in-Chief in December 1916, following Joffre's fall from grace. The decision to promote Nivelle was due to several factors, including his identity as a Protestant, his battlefield successes at Verdun, his ability to speak fluent English and his belief in his ability to break the deadlock. Having previously served in an artillery regiment, he championed the creeping barrage as a key to French success. In 1917, he and Douglas Haig, commander of the British Expeditionary Force, drew up plans for an offensive, known as the Nivelle offensive. The main part of the offensive, the Second Battle of the Aisne, was largely unsuccessful, extremely costly in terms of manpower and led directly to the 1917 French Army mutinies. As a result of his failures, Nivelle was urged to resign. On 15 May 1917, Philippe Pétain was appointed to replace him, though Nivelle refused to leave until 19 May.

Philippe Pétain was made Commander-in-Chief on 15 May 1917, after a few weeks as Army Chief of Staff. He is credited with resolving the French Army mutinies that had begun during that period. He had asked for moderation in dealing with the mutiny and, against military tradition, tried to replace the military hierarchy with a system based on mutual trust. He also rejected large-scale attacks until more allied soldiers arrived, and improved the living conditions of front-line soldiers, increasing fresh food and rest times. A cautious commander and trusted by troops, Petain stuck to a defensive strategy, with limited attacks. Due to his success in defending against German attacks during the Second Battle of the Marne, he was awarded the Médaille militaire, France's third highest military honour. Following the end of the war on 19 November 1918, Pétain was promoted to Marshal of France. Due to his role during the Battle of Verdun, French Army mutinies and reputation as a "soldier's soldier," he was considered a French hero, until his collaboration with Nazi Germany during the Second World War, for which he was tried and convicted.

== Western Front ==
=== 1914 ===
==== Battle of the Frontiers ====
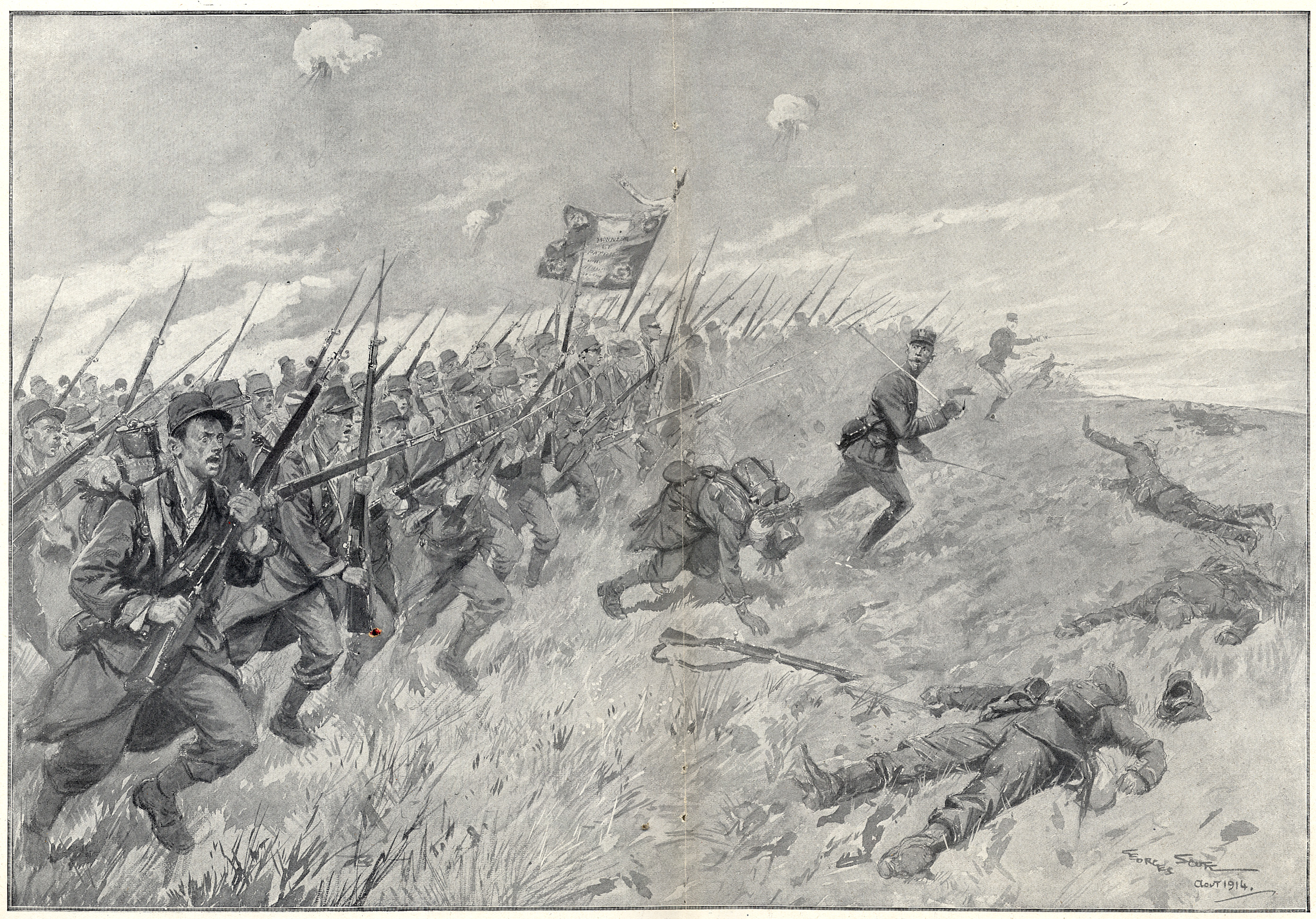
Bayonet charge in 1914

One of the first battles of the war, the Battle of the Frontiers, took place in August 1914. French Commander-in-Chief Joseph Joffre was attempting to implement the French Plan XVII, while German Chief-of-Staff Helmuth von Moltke was trying to implement the Schlieffen Plan and their efforts conflicted. consisted of five offensives, commanded and planned by French Commander-in-Chief Joseph Joffre and German Chief-of-Staff Helmuth von Moltke. The battles of Mulhouse and Dornach took place in Upper Alsace, the Battle of Donon took place in the Vosges, the battles of Lorraine, Morhange, and Sarrebourg took place on the Lorraine plateau, the Battle of the Ardennes took place in the Belgian Ardennes, and the battles of Charleroi and Mons took place in the Sambre-Meuse valley. The Battle of Mulhouse, on 7–10 August 1914, was envisioned by Joffre to anchor the French recapture of Alsace, but resulted in Joffre holding General Louis Bonneau responsible for its failure and replacing him with General Paul Pau. The Battle of Lorraine, 14–25 August, was an indecisive French invasion of that region by General Pau and his Army of Alsace. The Battle of the Ardennes, fought between 21 and 23 August in the Ardennes forests, was sparked by unsuspecting French and German forces meeting, and resulted in a French defeat, forfeiting to the Germans a source of iron ore. The Battle of Charleroi, which started on 20 August and ended on 23 August, resulted in a German victory. General Charles Lanrezac's retreat probably saved the French Army, but Joffre blamed him for the failure of Plan XVII, even though the withdrawal had been permitted. The Fifth Army retreat after the Battle of Charleroi, arguably saved the French army from decisive defeat, as it prevented the much sought envelopment of the Schlieffen plan. Lanrezac was sacked by Joffre on 3 September (four days after General Pierre Ruffey, the Third Army commander) and replaced by d'Espèrey.

Germany marched through neutral Belgium as part of the Schlieffen Plan to invade France, and by 23 August had reached the French border town of Maubeuge, whose true significance lay within its forts. Maubeuge was a major railway junction and was consequently a protected city. The German Siege of Maubeuge started on 25 August. The fortress was surrendered on 7 September by General Fournier, who was later court-martialed, but exonerated, for the capitulation. In a 2006 web article, Didier Lodier wrote that 1,300 French troops had been killed and 45,000 men (including 3,000 wounded) were captured along with 400 guns (most damaged) for 2,500 German casualties. In 2009, Holger Herwig wrote that the Germans took 32,692 prisoners and 450 guns when Maubeuge was surrendered on 6 September; the Germans suffered 1,100 casualties.

The Battle of Guise, launched on 29 August, was an attempt by the Fifth Army to capture Guise. They succeeded, but later withdrew on 30 August. This delayed the German Second Army's invasion of France, but also hurt Lanrezac's already damaged reputation.

==== First Battle of the Marne ====
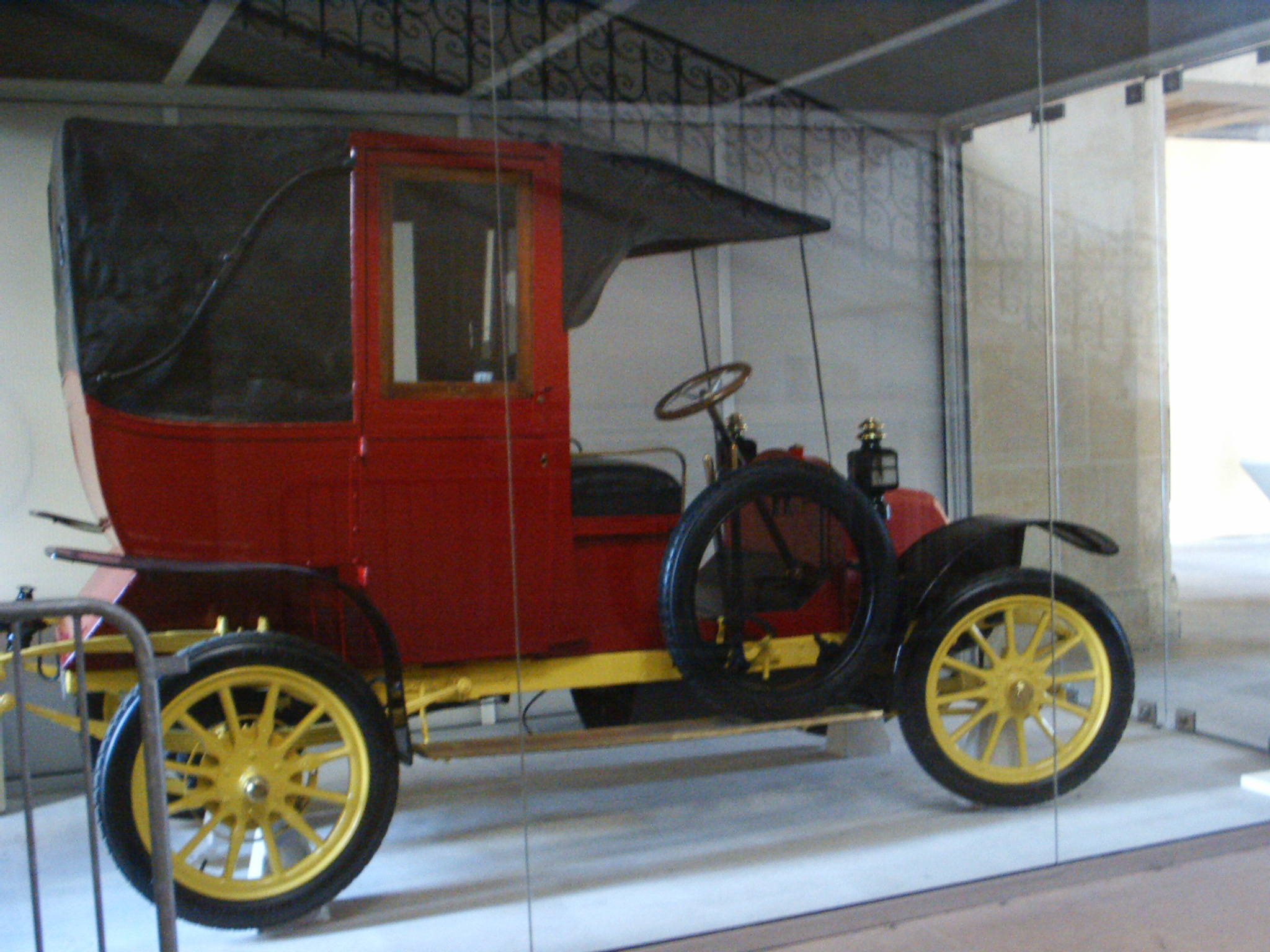
Renault Taxi de la Marne on display at the Army Museum (Paris), within Les Invalides at Paris.

The First Battle of the Marne was fought between 6 and 12 September. It started when retreating French forces (the Fifth and Sixth armies), stopped south of the Marne River. Victory seemed close, the First German Army was given orders to surround Paris, unaware the French government had already fled to Bordeaux. The First Battle of the Marne was a French victory, but was a bloody one: the French suffered 250,000 casualties, of which 80,000 died, with similar numbers believed for the Germans, and over 12,700 for the British.

==== First Battle of the Aisne ====
The German retreat after the First Battle of the Marne halted at the Aisne River, and the Allies soon caught up, starting the First Battle of the Aisne on 12 September. It lasted until 28 September, it was indecisive, partially due to machine guns beating back infantry sent to capture enemy positions.

==== Race to the Sea ====
From 17 September to mid-October, (Note: Writers and historians have criticised the term Race to the Sea and used several date ranges for the period of mutual attempts to outflank the opposing armies, on their northern flanks. In 1925, James Edmonds, the British official historian, used dates of 15 September – 15 October and in 1926 17 September – 19 October. In 1929, Hermann Mertz von Quirnheim, the fifth volume of the German official history Der Weltkrieg, described the progress of German outflanking attempts without labelling them. In 2001, Strachan used 15 September – 17 October and in 2003, Clayton gave dates of 17 September – 7 October. In 2005, Doughty used the period 17 September – 17 October and Foley from 17 September to a period between 10 and 21 October. In 2010 Sheldon placed the beginning of the "erroneously named" race from the end of the Battle of the Marne to the beginning of the Battle of the Yser.) Franco-British and German forces engaged in a series of flanking maneuvers now known as the 'Race to the Sea'. The 'race' was the result of attempts by opposing armies to outflank each other through the north, resulting in a northward movement of the front lines, eventually stopping when they reached the 'sea'. The First Battle of Albert was the first battle in the so-called 'Race to the Sea'. The First Battle of Albert was fought on 25–29 September 1914, after the First Battle of the Marne and the First Battle of the Aisne. It occurred after both sides realized that a breakthrough was not possible. It was evident that both the French Plan XVII and the German Schlieffen Plan had failed. Both sides then proceeded to attempt to outmanoeuvre the other, and the battle ended indecisively. The Battle of Arras, which was another attempt on the part of the French to outflank the Germans, was started on 1 October. Despite heavy attacks by three corps from the First, Second, and Seventh armies, the French held on to Arras, albeit losing Lens on 4 October. The Battle of the Yser, fought between 18 October and 30 November, was the northernmost battle in the 'Race to the Sea'. The battle was a German victory, and fighting continued along the Yser River until the final Allied advance that won the war. A Brigade of French naval infantry (Fusiliers marins), identifiable by their red pompoms on their caps, distinguished themselves during the fighting.

The last of the 'Race to the Sea' battles, the First Battle of Ypres, started on 19 October, marked the formation of a bond between the British and French armies. The battle was an Allied victory and ended, according to France, Britain, and Germany, on 13, 22 or 30 November, respectively. The formations of the French VIII Army participated in this battle. On 23 October, the French IX Corps took over the north end of the Ypres salient, relieving I Corps with the 17th Division. The BEF had many casualties and used all its reserves but on 30 October the French IX Corps sent its last three Zouave battalions and retrieved the situation in the I Corps sector. On 31 October, German attacks near Gheluvelt broke through until a counter-attack by the Worcestershire Regiment restored the situation. On 12 November, a German attack surprised the French IX Corps and the British 8th Division arrived at the front on 13 November and more attacks were made on the British II Corps front from 14 November. Between 15 and 22 November, I Corps was relieved by the French IX and XVI corps and the British line was reorganised.

==== First Battle of Champagne ====
The first major Allied attack against German forces since the incarnation of trench warfare on the Western Front, the First Battle of Champagne, lasting from 20 December 1914, until 17 March 1915; it was a German victory. Joffre felt that the failure of the offensive was due to inadequate artillery support and too few infantry. Attacks had been made on narrow fronts of a few hundred yards, despite the offensive taking place on a 12 mi (19 km) front and left infantry far too vulnerable to massed artillery-fire. De Langle was ordered quickly to make several limited attacks but Joffre told Poincaré the French president, that a war of movement was a long way off.

=== 1915 ===
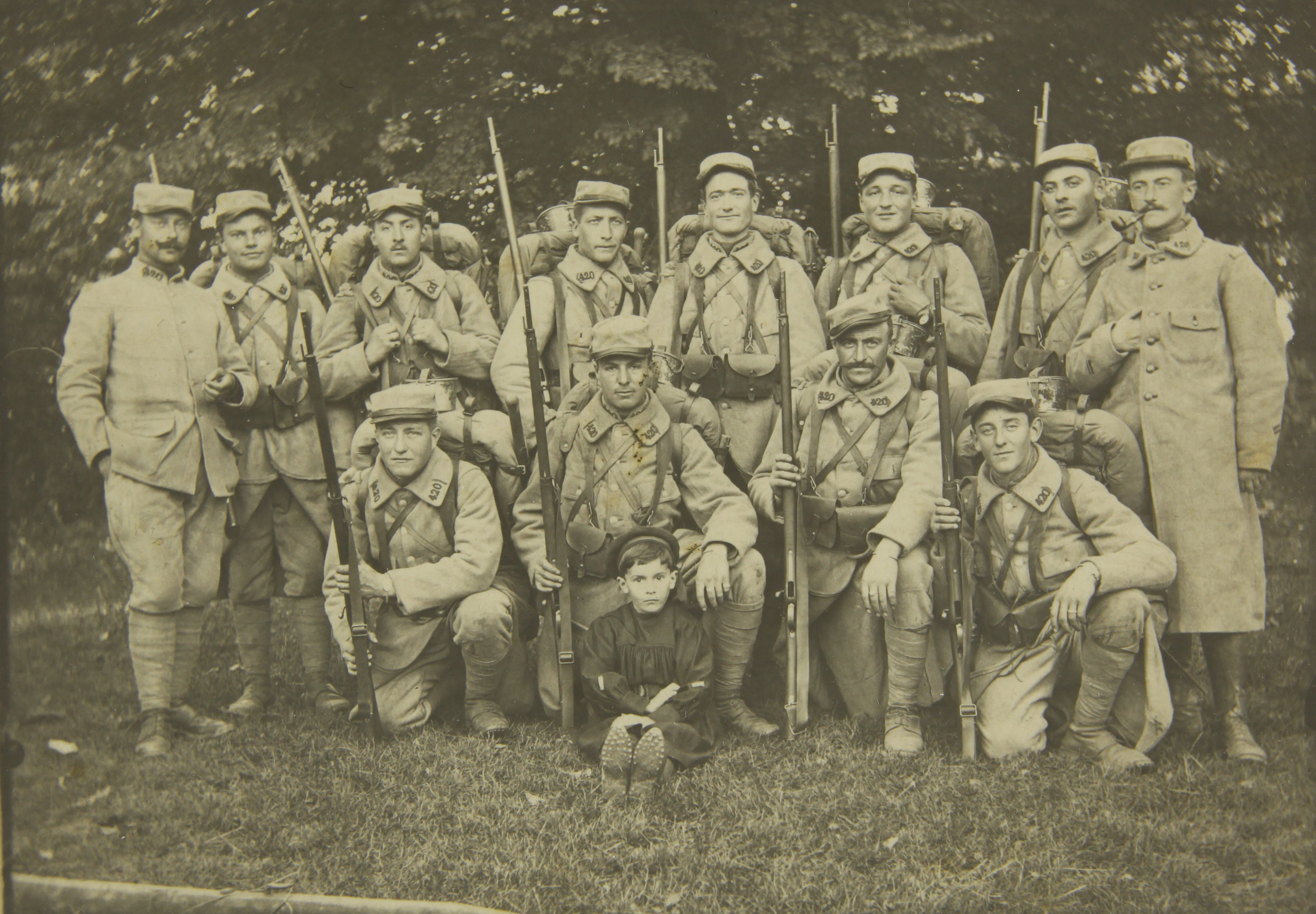
A squad of the 420th Infantry Regiment in the Saint-Germain-du-Puy region, October 1915

The indecisive Second Battle of Ypres, from 22 April – 25 May, was the site of the first German chlorine gas attack and the only major German offensive on the Western Front in 1915. Ypres was devastated after the battle.

The Second Battle of Artois, from 9 May – 18 June, the most important part of the Allied spring offensive of 1915, was not the success the allies had hoped for. Despite the change from attempts at continuous battle to methodical attacks, with pauses to reorganise and consolidate, the French took less ground, fewer prisoners and suffered more casualties. Vimy Ridge would not be in Allied hands again until 1917.

The Second Battle of Champagne, from 25 September – 6 November, was a general failure, with the French only advancing about 4 kilometres (2.5 mi), and not capturing the German's second line. The French Official History recorded 191,795 casualties in the fighting in Champagne and Artois.

=== 1916 ===
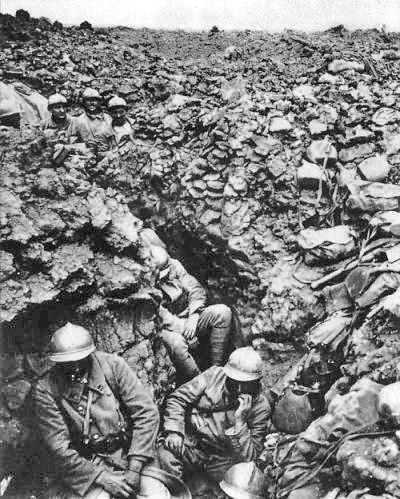
Soldiers of the 87th Regiment, 6th Division at Côte 304 (Hill 304), northwest of Verdun, in 1916

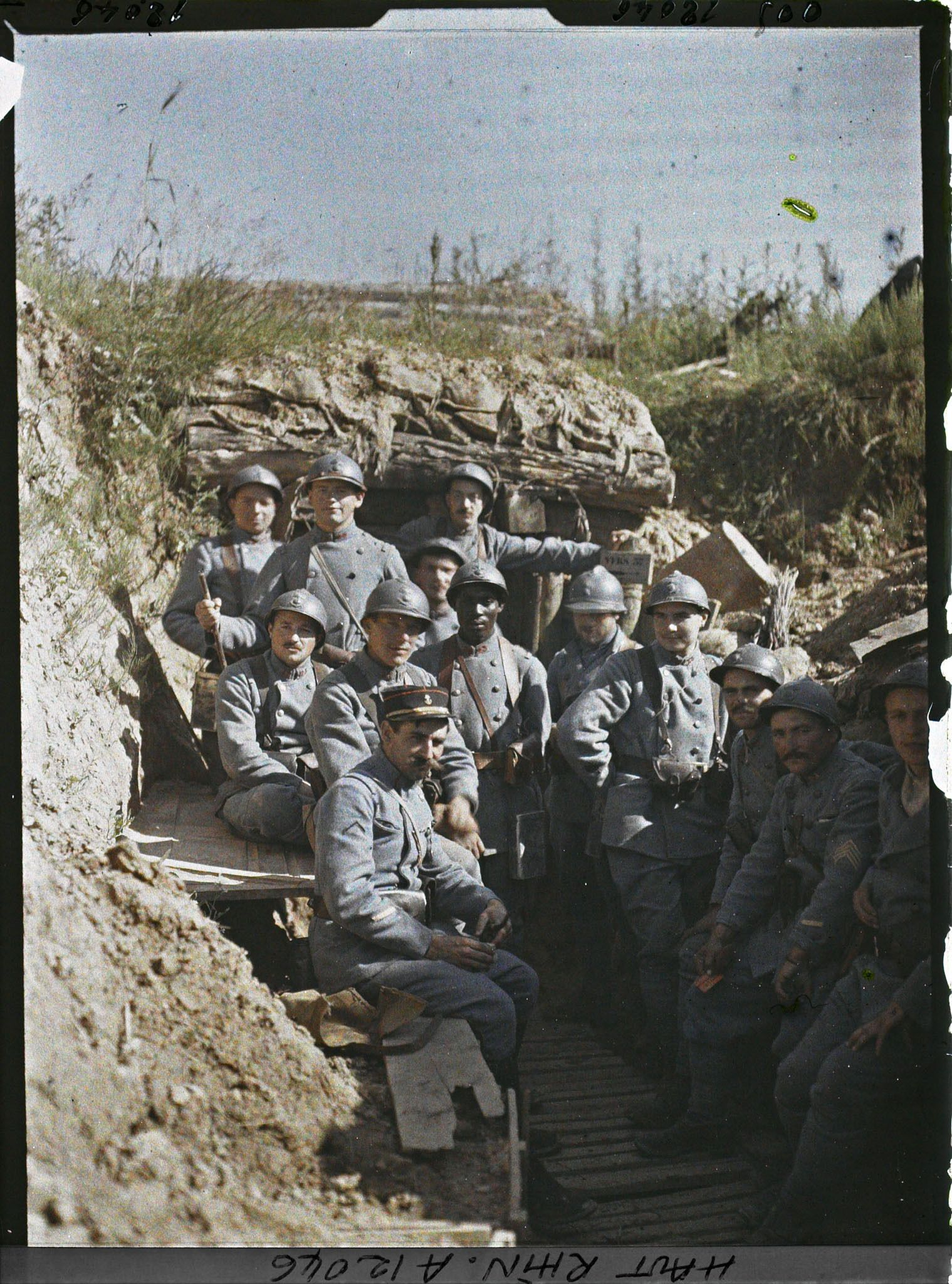
French poilus (soldiers) posing in a trench, 16 June 1917. Note the Adrian helmets.

==== Battle of Verdun ====
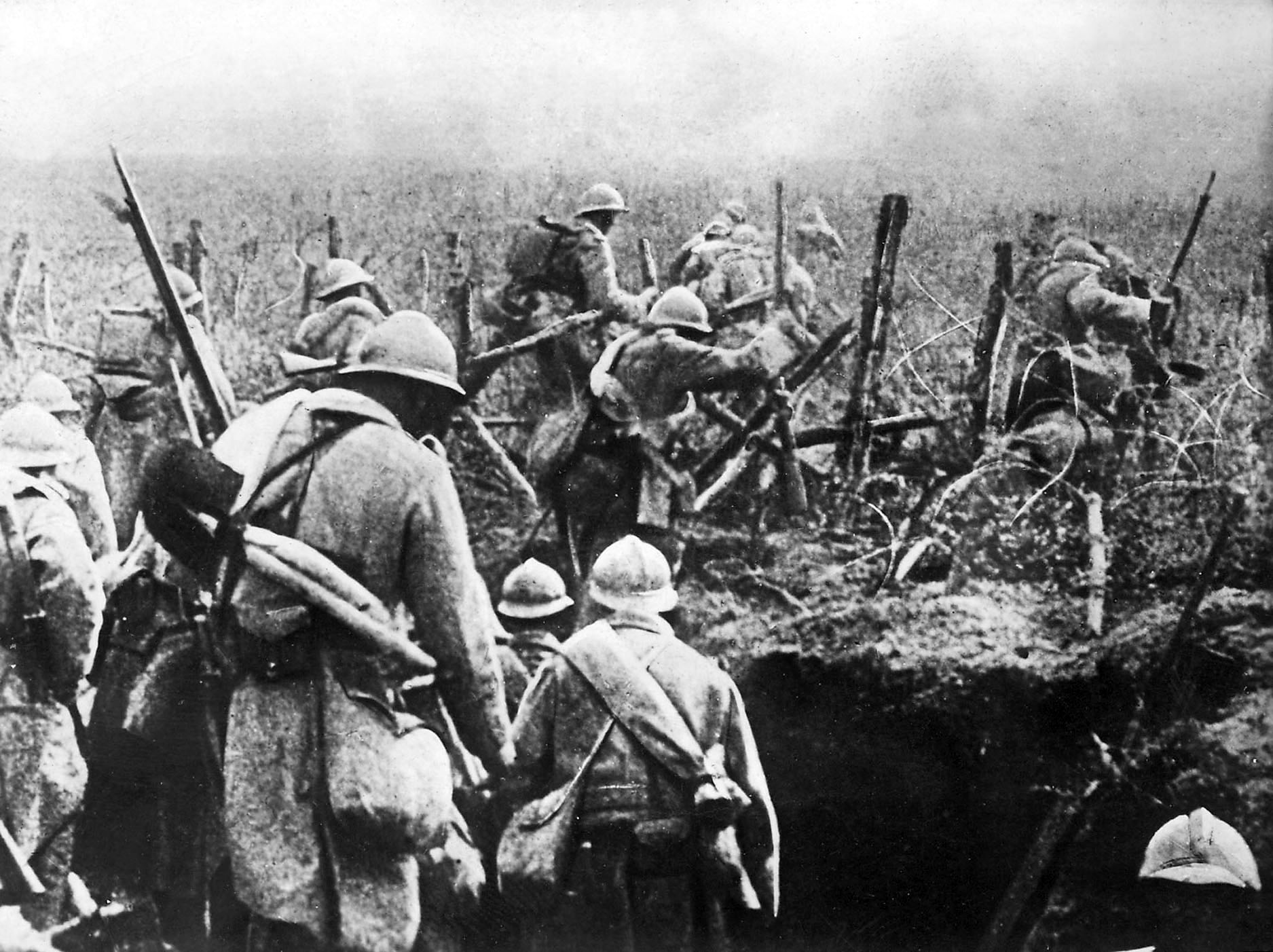
French soldiers storming out of their trench during the Battle of Verdun, 1916

The Battle of Verdun was the longest of the war, lasting from 21 February 1916, until 18 December of the same year. The battle started after a plan by German General Erich von Falkenhayn to capture Verdun and induce a battle of attrition was executed. After a few weeks, the battle became a series of local actions. For the French, the battle signified the strength and fortitude of the French Army. Many military historians consider Verdun the "most demanding" and the "greatest" battle in history.

The German attack on Verdun began with one million troops, led by Crown Prince Wilhelm, facing only about 200,000 French soldiers. The following day, the French were forced to withdraw to their second line of trenches, and on 24 February, they were pushed back to their third line, only 8 kilometres (5.0 mi) from Verdun. The newly appointed commander of the Verdun sector, General Philippe Pétain, stated that there would be no more withdrawals, and eventually had every French soldier that was available fighting in the Verdun sector; 259 out of 330 infantry regiments. A single road remained open for trucks, enabling a continual flow of supplies to the defenders.

The German attacking forces were not able to enter the city of Verdun itself and by December 1916 had been forced back beyond the original French trench lines of February. The sector again became a relatively inactive one as the allied focus shifted to the Somme and the Germans adopted a defensive stance. While generally regarded as a tactical victory for the French, the battle caused massive losses on both sides. French casualties had been higher but the original German objective of taking Verdun while destroying the defending army through a battle of attrition had not succeeded.

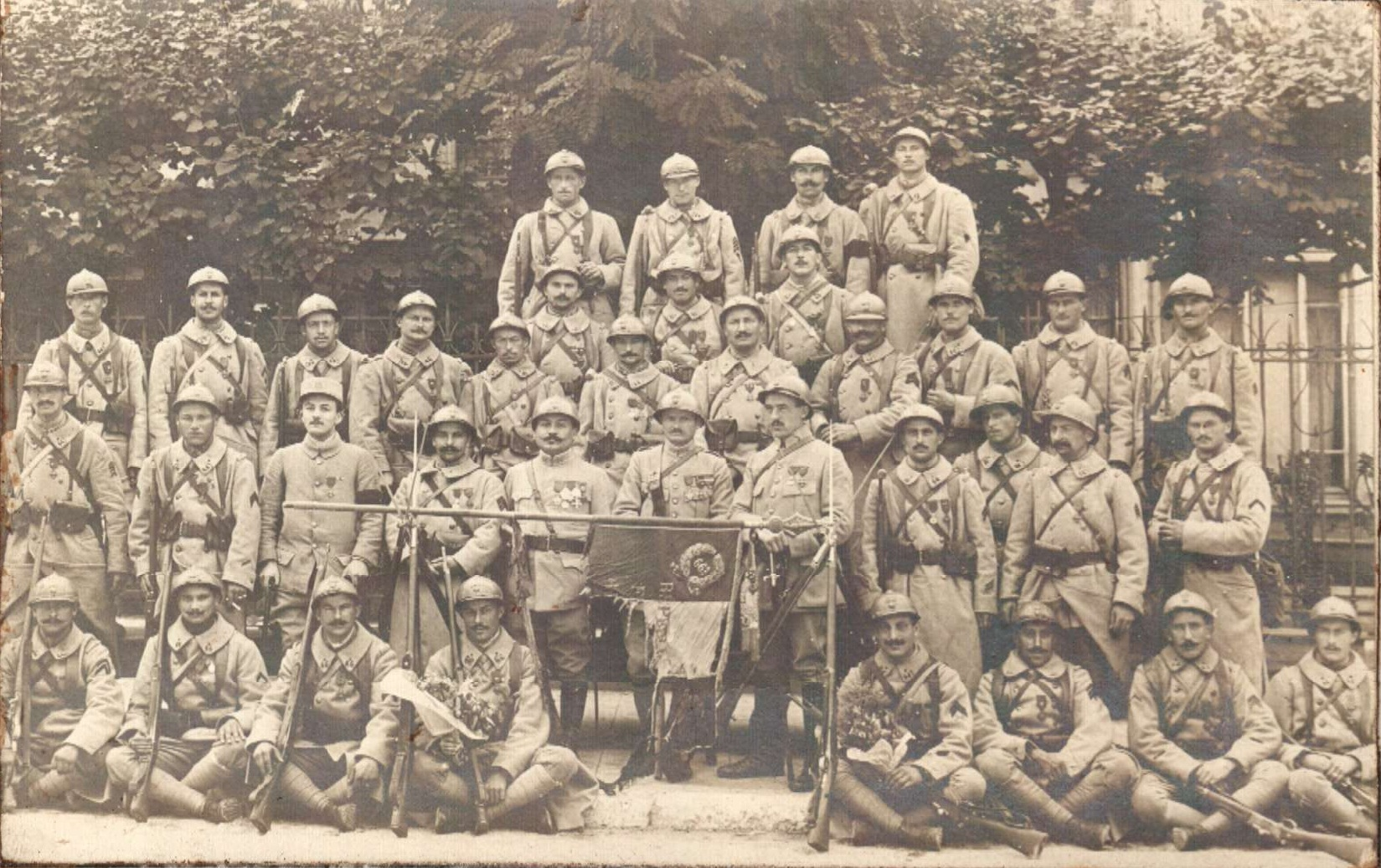
66th Infantry Regiment in 1917

==== Battle of the Somme ====
The French and British had committed themselves to an offensive on the Somme during the Chantilly Conference in December 1915. The fighting at Verdun impacted upon the French plans, consequently Army Group North had only 22 divisions and 555 pieces of artillery, instead of the 39 divisions and 1,700 pieces of artillery initially planned. The British held positions in the sector north of the river Somme, the French were south of the river.

The Sixth Army (France), with one corps on the north bank from Maricourt to the Somme and two corps on the south bank southwards to Foucaucourt, would make a subsidiary attack to guard the right flank of the main attack being made by the British. The French, using combined arms tactics, were successful in their attacks against the Germans on 1 and 2 July. Between Belloy and the Somme, an area measuring more than 10 kilometres, the enemy had been destroyed, driven back or taken prisoner. On 3 July, Joffre ordered the attack to stop. Five days later, he ordered an attack in the south, but in the mean time, the Germans had used this time to regroup. The offensive lasted a week, and failed. A renewed French assault took place on 3 September, with fierce fighting around the towns of Combles and Bouchavesnes. By 20 September, French forces had entered into the worst phase of fighting.

The Battle of the Somme, fought along a 30 kilometres (19 mi) front from north of the Somme River between Arras and Albert. It was fought between 1 July and 18 November and involved over 2 million men. The French suffered 202,567 casualties.

- The Groupe d'Armées du Nord, commanded by Foch, comprised
  - The 6th Army (Fayolle) with three army corps (1st, 20th and 35th CA);
  - The 10th Army (Micheler) with five army corps .

They total fourteen divisions in line, four in reserve and four cavalry along a of 15 kilometre front.

=== 1917 ===
==== Nivelle Offensive ====
In October 1916, troops under Robert Nivelle's command captured Douaumont and other Verdun forts, making him a national hero. Nivelle formulated a plan using his "creeping barrage" tactics that would supposedly end the war in 48 hours with only 10,000 casualties. War Minister Hubert Lyautey, General Philippe Pétain and Sir Douglas Haig were all opposed to the plan, although Aristide Briand supported the "Nivelle Offensive". Lyautey resigned after being shouted down in the Chamber of Deputies for refusing to discuss military aviation secrets. For the offensive in April 1917, one million French soldiers were deployed on a front between Royle and Reims.

The main action of the Nivelle Offensive, the Second Battle of the Aisne, started on 16 April 1917, the French had 134,000 casualties including 30,000 killed in the first nine days. In 1962 Gerald Nicholson, the Canadian official historian, recorded German casualties of c. 163,000 and French casualties of c. 187,000 men. The Allies eventually suffered over 350,000 casualties fighting the Nivelle Offensive.

==== Mutinies ====
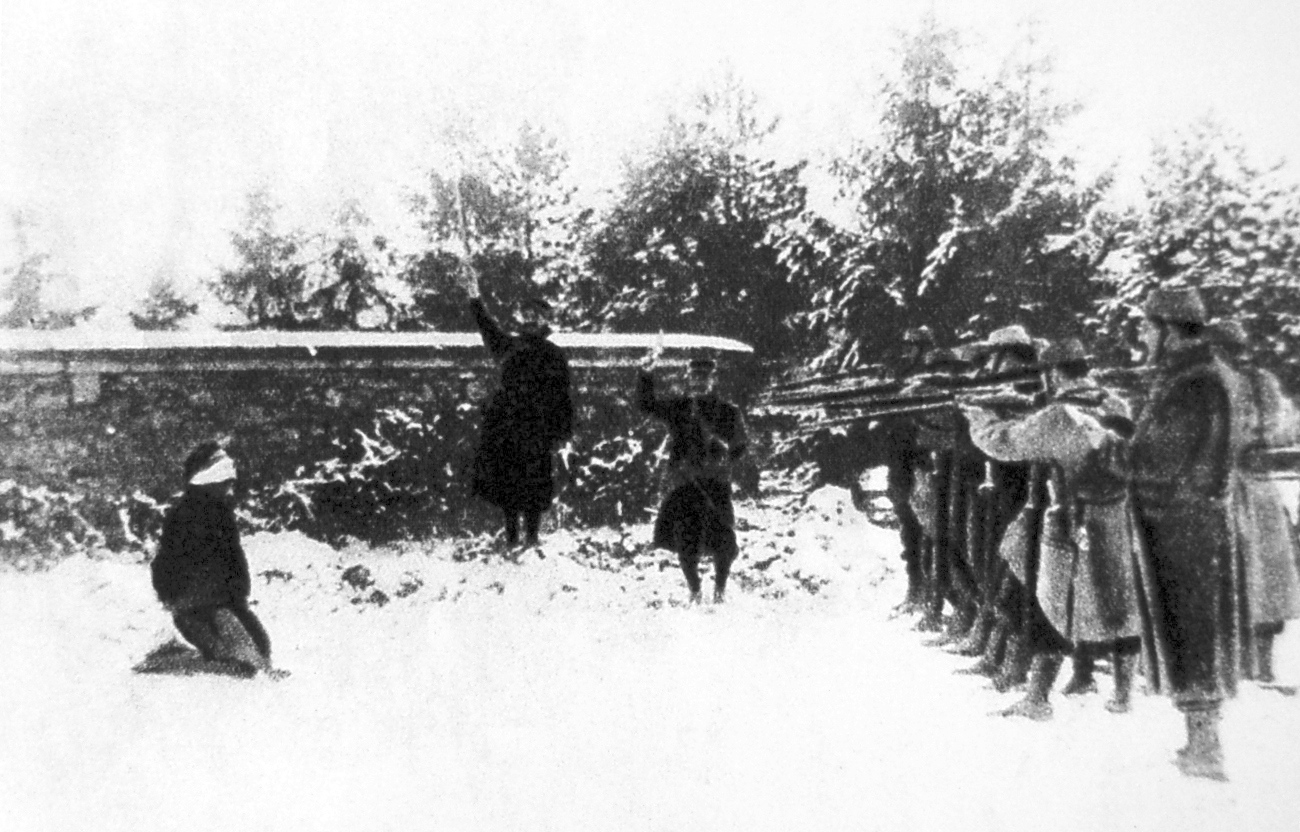
Execution reportedly at Verdun at the time of the mutinies. The original French text accompanying this photograph notes however that the uniforms are those of 1914/15 and that the execution may be that of a spy at the beginning of the war

In the spring of 1917, after the failed Nivelle Offensive, there were a series of mutinies in the French army. Over 35,000 soldiers were involved with 68 out of 112 divisions affected, but fewer than 3,000 men were punished. Following a series of courts-martial, there were 49 documented executions and 2,878 sentences to penal servitude with hard labour. Of the 68 divisions affected by mutinies, 5 had been "profoundly affected"' 6 had been "very seriously affected", 15 had been "seriously affected", 25 were affected by "repeated incidents" and 17 had been affected by "one incident only", according to statistics compiled by French military historian Guy Pedroncini.

Mutinies began in April 1917 after the failure of the Second Battle of the Aisne, the main action in the Nivelle Offensive. The mutinies started on 17 April and ended on 30 June 1917. They involved units from nearly half of the French infantry divisions stationed on the Western Front. The mutinies were kept secret at the time, and their full extent and intensity were not revealed for a half-century. The more serious episodes involved only a few units; the mutinies did not threaten complete military collapse, but did make the high command reluctant to launch another offensive. The popular cry was to wait for the arrival of millions of fresh U.S. troops. The mutinous soldiers were motivated by despair, not by politics or pacifism. They feared that mass infantry offensives would never prevail over machine guns and artillery. General Pétain restored morale in the summer of 1917 through a combination of rest rotations for front-line units, furloughs home, and stricter discipline. However, Smith has argued that the mutinies were akin to labour strikes and can be considered political. The soldiers demanded not only peace, leave, and better food, and objected to the use of colonial workers on the home front; they were also concerned about the welfare of their families. The courts-martial were merely symbolic, designed to demonstrate the absolute authority of the high command. The British government was alarmed, for it interpreted the mutinies as a sign of deep malaise in French society, and tried to reinvigorate French morale by launching an offensive at Passchendaele (also known as the Third Battle of Ypres).

=== 1918 ===
==== Kaiserschlacht ====
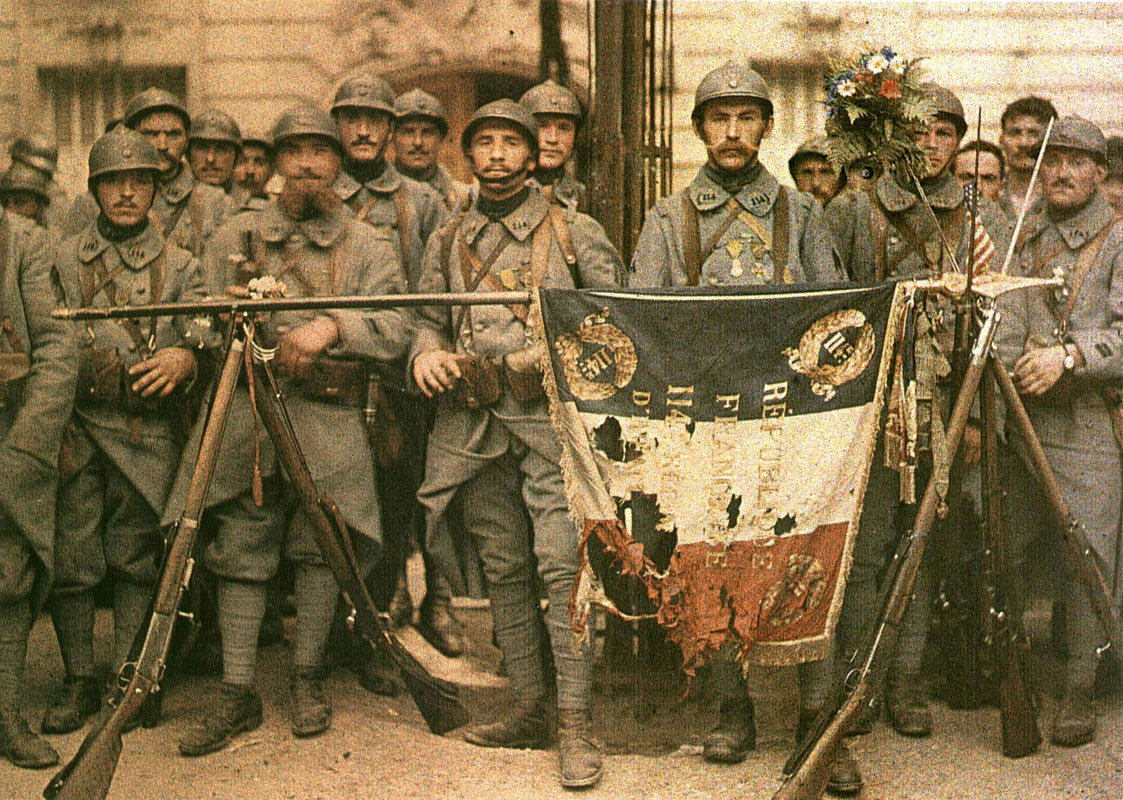
The 114th infantry in Paris, 14 July 1917.

The French army was heavily involved in the allies' line of defense during the final German offensives in spring 1918. When British troops were attacked during Operation Michael, 40 French divisions were sent to help them. Those troops finally took part in the battle. Then, the third German offensive was launched against French positions in Champagne. The French troops began to lose ground but eventually, the Germans were stopped by a counterattack led by General Charles Mangin.

In July, a last German assault was launched against the French on the Marne. The German troops were crushed by about 40 French divisions helped by British and American troops. This was a turning point in the war on the Western Front.

==== The Grand Offensive ====
During the summer of 1918, General Ferdinand Foch was appointed supreme commander of the allied forces. After the decisive defeat of the Germans at the second Battle of the Marne, Foch ordered an offensive against Amiens. Some French units participated in this battle. Then, a general offensive was launched against the German positions in France. The French First Army helped the British troops in the north, while eight French field armies formed the center of the offensive. An additional army was sent to help the Americans. The French forces were the most numerous of all the allied troops, and during the last stage of the war, they took about 140,000 prisoners. British troops spearheaded the main attack by attacking in Flanders and Western Belgium where they first smashed the Hindenburg line. Meanwhile, the more exhausted French army managed to liberate most of northern France and to enter Belgian territory.

These numerous offensives left the German army on the verge of disaster and when Germany sought for an armistice, British, French and American troops were ready to launch an important offensive in Lorraine, where the Germans were collapsing.

== Other campaigns ==
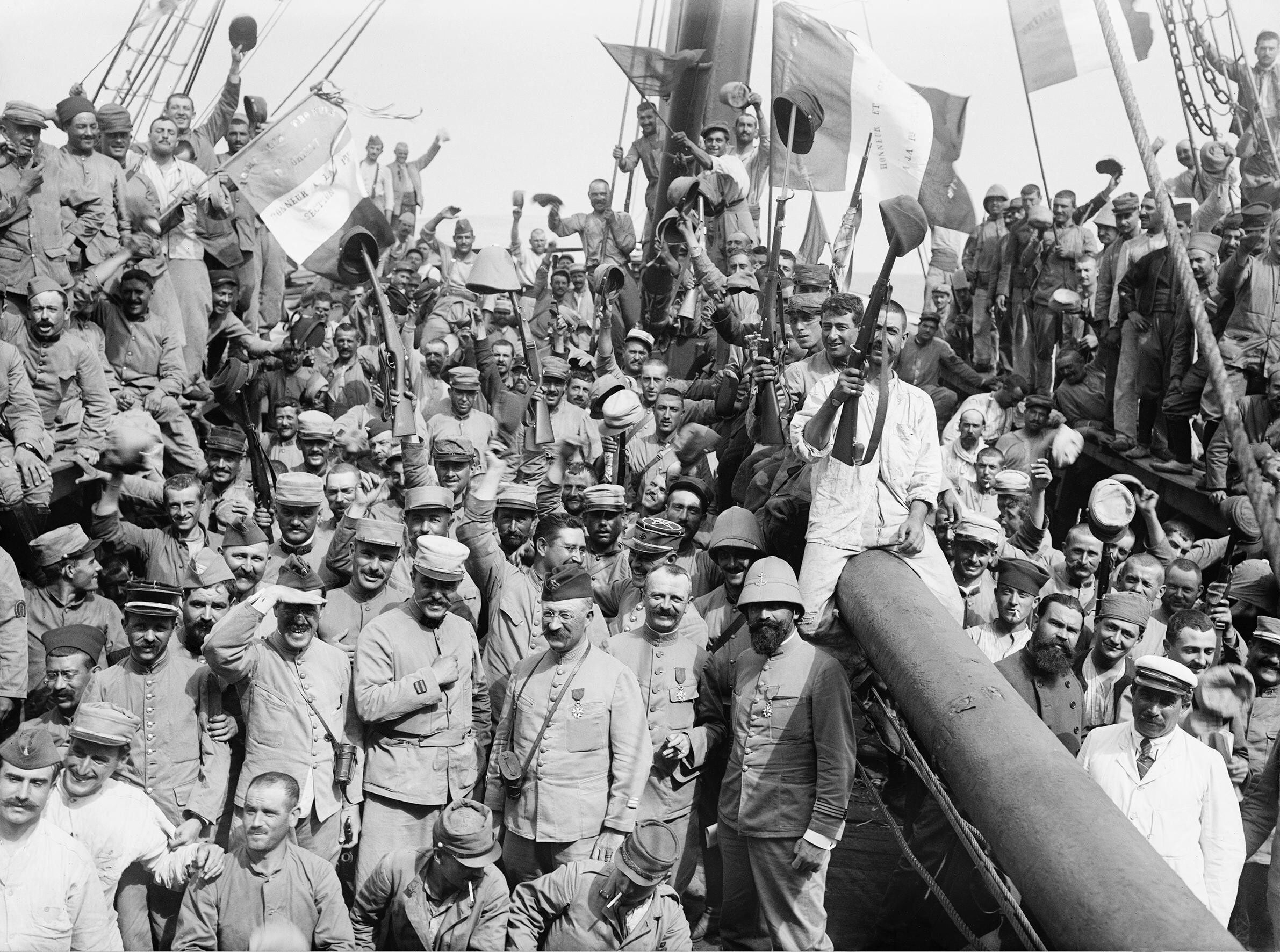
French troops going to Gallipoli in 1915

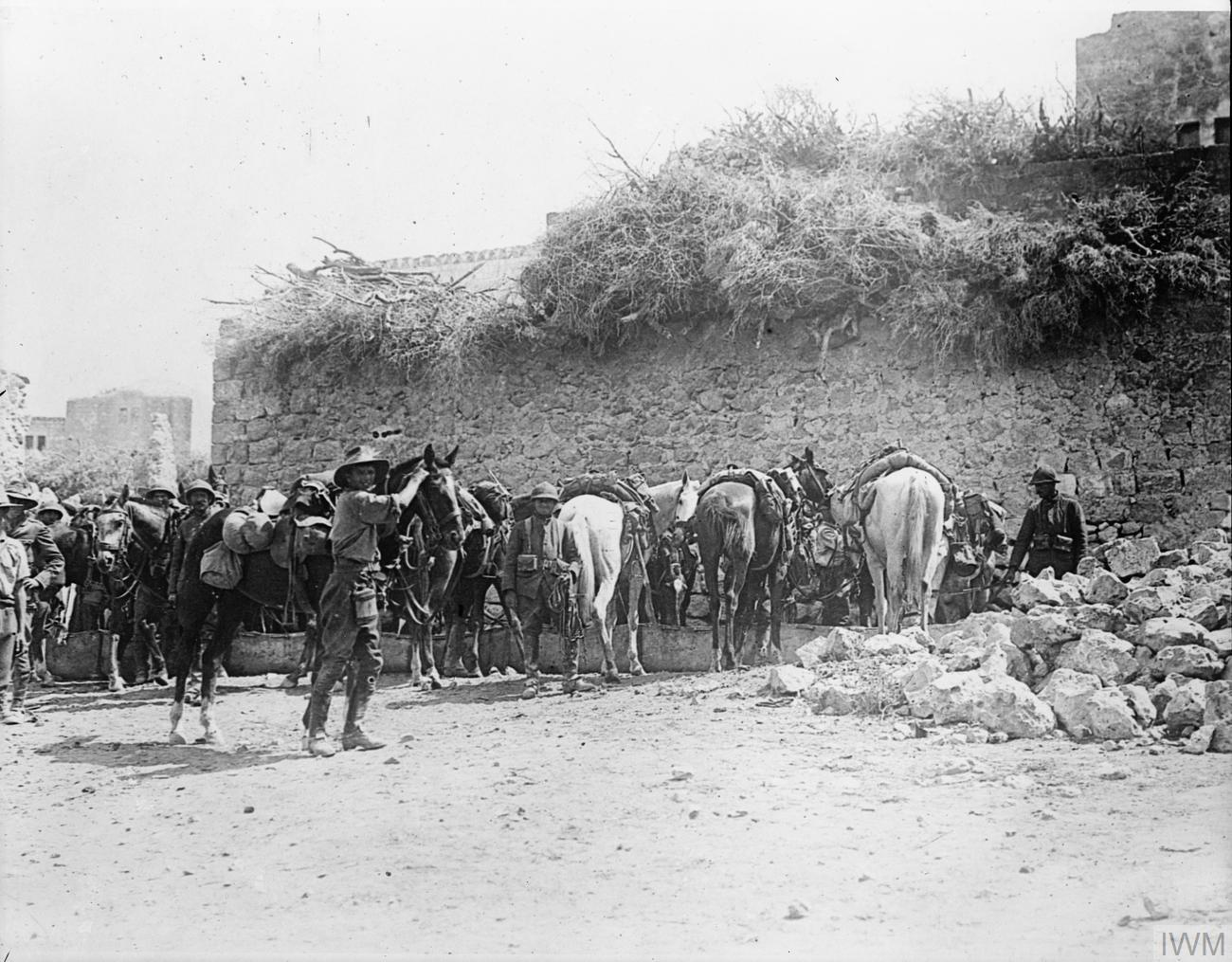
Horsemen of the 4th Regiment Chasseurs d'Afrique and Australian 5th Light Horse Brigade, in the village of Anebta, which they entered on 19 September 1918 after the Battle of Sharon.

While the French Army's main commitment was inevitably to the Western Front, significant forces were deployed in other theatres of war. These included the occupation of the German colonies of Togo and Kamerun in West Africa, participation in the Dardanellesand Palestinian campaigns against the Ottoman Empire and a diversionary offensive in the Balkans carried out in conjunction with other Allied forces.

When looking at the respective Order of battle for each of the French military forces utilised in the West African, Dardanelles and Palestine campaigns, a sizeable proportion were North African and colonial units, both European and indigenous. However the French reinforcements, comprising six infantry divisions, (Note: The French units were (i) 12th Army Corps (France) (ii) 10th Army (France) and (iii) 31st Army Corps (France) comprising (1) 23rd Division, 24th Division, (2) 46th Division, 47th Division and (3) 64th Division, 65th Division respectively.) sent to the Italian Front in 1917 following the Battle of Caporetto were drawn from mainland metropolitan French units, marking a diversion of resources from the Western Front. On 29 March 1918, Jean César Graziani became commander of the 12th French Army Corps, amounting to the two remaining divisions stationed in Italy, and helped to repulse in June the Austrian offensive during the Battle of the Piave River.

In addition to providing troops for combat in overseas theatres of war, the French were to assist other allies with training teams to train other nations soldiers, in particular the reconstituted Serbs and the American army. The biggest French training deployment to help an ally was the mission to Romania, led by Henri Berthelot, during the second half of the war.

== Equipment ==
=== Artillery ===
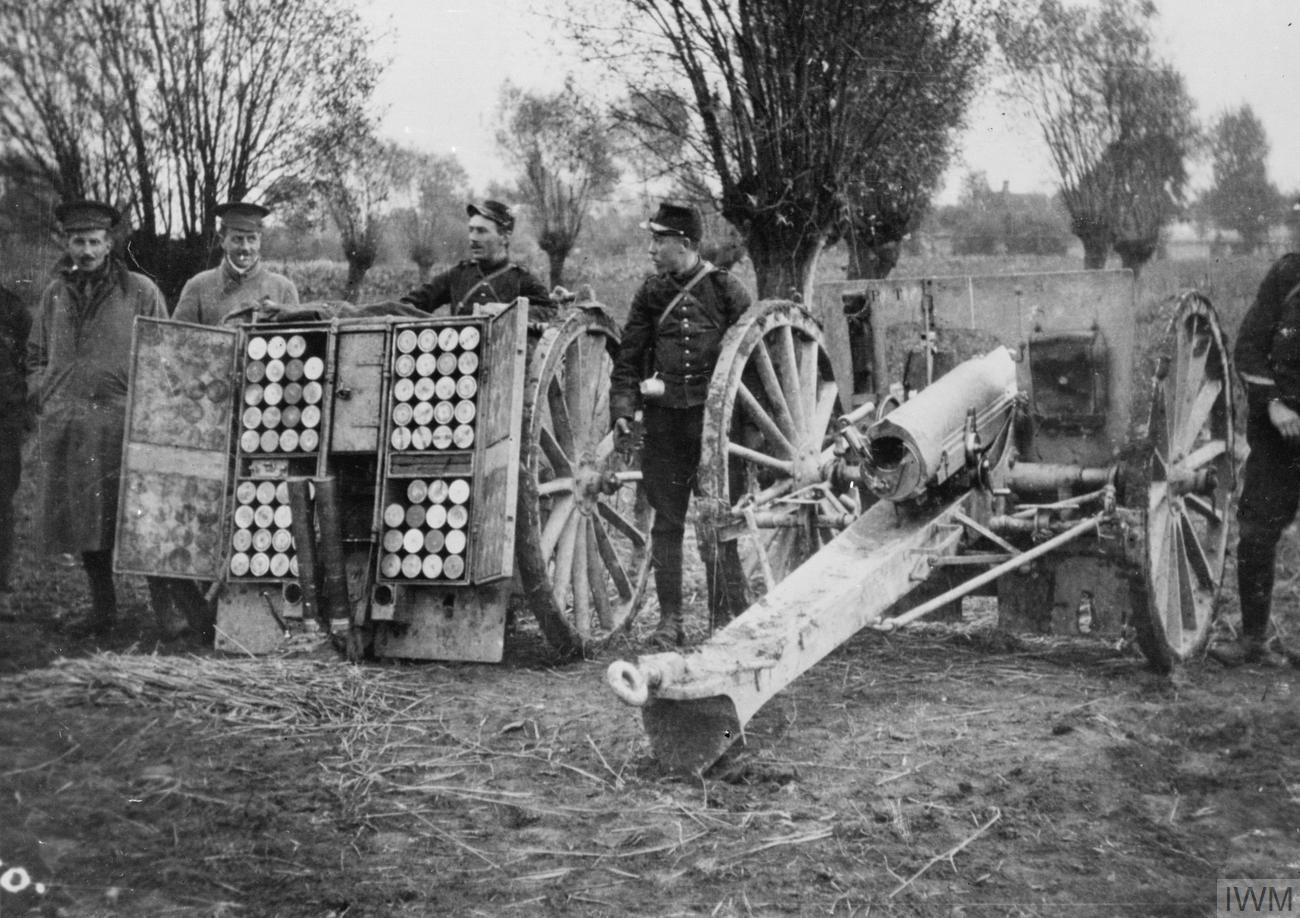
The displaying of a 75mm gun model 1897 and its ammunition wagon by French artillerymen (in midnight blue uniform) to Scottish infantry officers (in khaki), at Bas Mesnil on the fringes of the Battle of Armentières on 21 October 1914. This relatively light and fast-firing gun was by far the most widely used by the French artillery (several thousand units) before, during and after the conflict.

The armament of the French field artillery in 1914 consisted almost entirely of one gun model, the 75 mm model 1897: the total allocation was 4,986 75 mm guns, of which 3,680 were part of the battle corps deployed in France and 364 were in the fortifications (the other 75 mm guns were used for training, in the colonies or in the reserves). This homogeneity had the advantage of facilitating logistics and maintenance. This endowment was completed by 128 65 mm M model 1906 guns (M for "mountain") intended for Alpine troops, as well as by a few 75 mm model 1912 guns for the horse artillery. It had a rate of fire of 12 to 18 rounds per minute and a maximum range of between 6 and 10 kilometres.

The heavy field artillery was rather limited in 1914, especially compared to its German counterpart: the fault lies in the disagreements between the services, the lack of financing and the domination of the 75 mm. The armies nevertheless took with them 84 howitzers of 120 mm C model 1890 (C for "court" meaning short, nicknamed 120 mm Baquet; 126 other howitzers were in the rear) and 104 howitzers of 155 mm C TR model 1904 (C TR for "short rapid-fire", nicknamed 155 mm Rimailho.

=== Rifles ===
From 1915, the Berthier Mle 1907/15 rifle replaced the Lebel Model 1886 rifle, it had a three-round magazine. Later this rifle is also modified into a Berthier Mle 1916 rifle to use five-round magazines.

=== Machine Guns ===
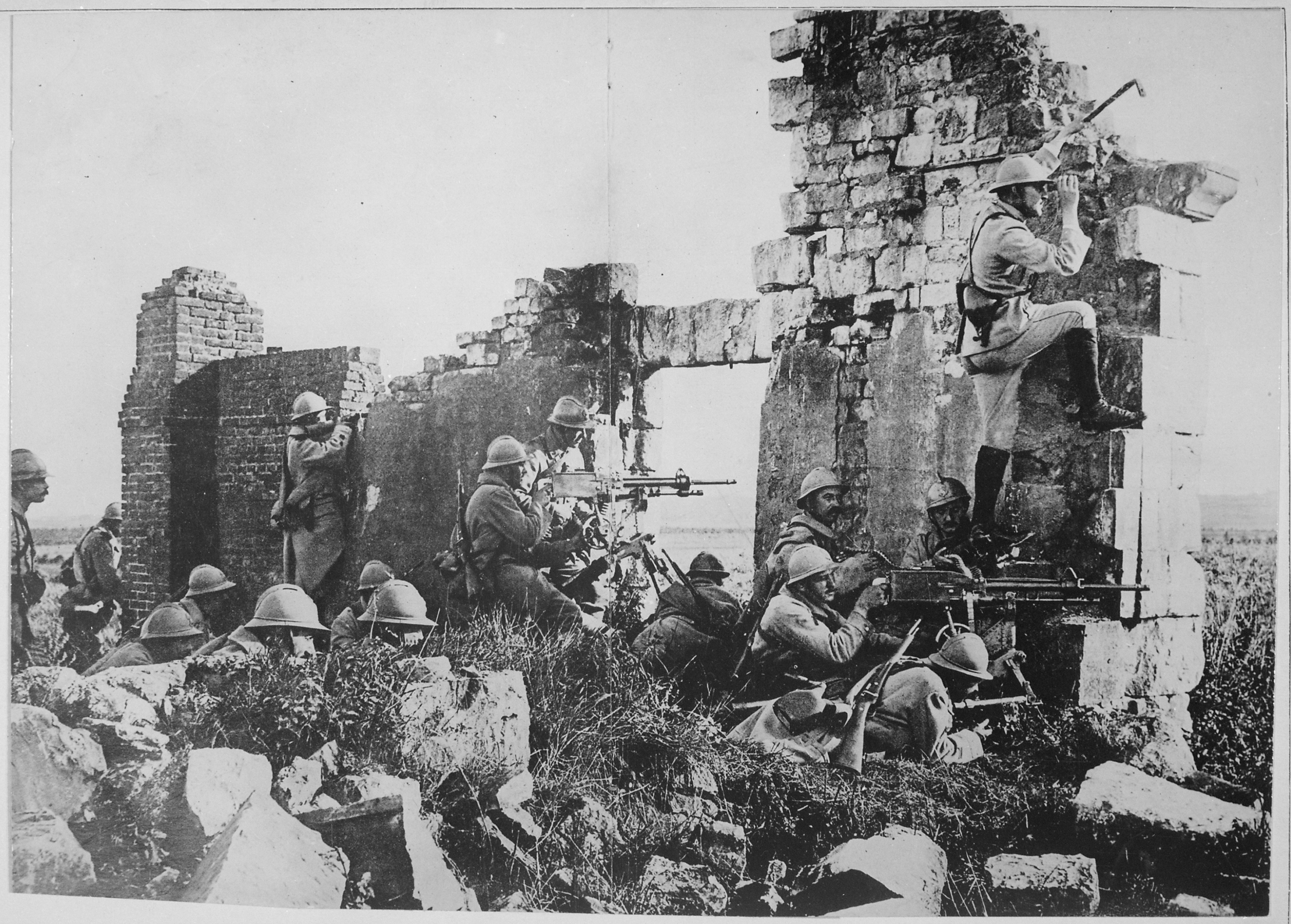
French machine gunners defend a ruined cathedral, late in the war

When war broke out in August 1914, the French models of machine gun in existence were the St. Étienne Mle 1907 and the Hotchkiss M1914. The Saint-Etienne machine gun was gradually abandoned because it was considered too fragile for use in trench warfare and disappeared from the front lines in 1917. It was replaced by the Hotchkiss machine gun, which was gas actuated and air-cooled. This machine gun allows two types of fire, intermittent fire or automatic fire, it has a rate of fire of 450 rounds/min, it is fed by metal cartridge magazines of 24 rounds or by flexible belts of 300 rounds. At the start of the war, each infantry battalion's medium machine gun section had two guns, (Note: This was also the case for the machine gun section of British infantry battalions, and German infantry battalions too.) but this increased fourfold as the war continued. Machine gun companies were grouped at regimental and brigade level, with a similar practice being undertaken by the Infantry Branch of the Machine Gun Corps in the British Army.

In January 1915, Joffre ordered research into a light machine gun to obtain significant firepower while being mobile. In 1916, the Chauchat machine gun was put into service, this lighter weapon had less staff to crew the weapon, semi-circular magazines of 20 cartridges with a potential rate of fire of 250 rounds/min. It had the possibility of firing by shot (60 to 80 rounds/min) or machine gun fire. This weapon allowed for mowing and rapid changes of target, and had an accuracy equivalent to a machine gun up to 600 or 700 metres, after which the dispersion of fire was greater. Each infantry company was equipped with 8 of these light machine guns.

=== Grenades ===
The French army initially used stocks of model 1882 hand grenades, initially intended for the defence of forts. During 1915, many prototypes of explosive, suffocating, tear gas, incendiary and smoke grenades were tested on the front. These different grenades were categorised as the fuse type with a slow-burning fuse that caused the explosion 5 seconds after being triggered, or, the percussion type whose explosion was caused by the impact of the firing pin. After much trial and error, percussion grenades were abandoned, with the exception of the Citron-Foug, because of their dangerous use. In 1916, Citron-Foug percussion grenades and F1 grenades were adopted in defensive combat phases. In offensive combat mode, short-range explosive OF grenades, suffocating grenades, incendiary grenades and smoke grenades model 1916 were preferred. At the end of 1915, the first trials of the Viven-Bessières rifle grenade began. In 1916, this weapon was in general issued: the use of a cup discharger at the end of the rifle and a balle D propulsive cartridge made it possible to send the grenade (475 grams, including 60 grams of explosives) in good safety conditions to 190 metres. It is then possible to produce a barrage during a defensive phase, to destroy battlements during harassment battles or to reach hidden machine guns during offensive phases.

=== Trench Mortars ===
At the beginning of World War I, the German Army had a stockpile of 150 mortars, which was a surprise to the French and British. The French were able to use modèle 1838 Coehorn mortars dating from just after the Napoleonic Wars, some of which were lent to the British. The Mortier de 58 T was hastily developed at the start of the war. From February 1915 onwards, the high-powered trench mortars were entrusted exclusively to the artillery (organised in batteries of twelve pieces), while the low-powered ones were left to the infantry. The Centre d'instruction de l'artillerie de tranchée (CIAT) was created the same year in Bourges. Given the contempt of the other artillerymen for these units, the personnel assigned to the trench artillery (TA) initially included convicts with suspended sentences from courts-martial coming from all the branches of the army. Later in the war, having ordered 1000 examples in July 1917, the French improved upon the design of the British Stokes Mortar. Further development of the mortar and improved ammunition that continued into the inter-war period would lead to the Brandt Mle 27/31. In September 1917 the French under-secretary of state for inventions sent a circular letter requesting inventors to design a better projectile for the successful Stokes mortar, and Brandt scaled his 60 mm projectile up to 81 mm. Both British and French military adopted the scaled-up design except for the grooves (apparently, their importance wasn't realized at the time) in 1918 as projectile BM (Brandt-Maurice) modèle 1918 (later simplified to FA (fonte aciérée) modèle 1921) and Mk. II HE bomb respectively. At the conclusion of the war, French infantry made use of both 81mm Stokes and 75 mm Jouhandeau-Deslandres mortars, their two principle fire support mortars.

=== Chemical weapons and gas ===
France became the first country to use chemical warfare in World War I when it launched tear gas grenades against the German army in August 1914. However, the Germans were the first to seriously research chemical warfare. The first deadly gases used were made from halogens (chlorine, bromine, iodine) for the production of which Germany enjoyed a virtual European monopoly in 1914. The German army was the first to use poisonous gas when it deployed chlorine at the Second Battle of Ypres on 22 April 1915.

The initial response was to improvise and use pads soaked with bicarbonate of soda or urine. The French adopted the M2 gas mask from March 1916 onwards. This was superseded by the ARS (appareil respiratoire spécial), a copy of the German GM15 gas mask, with charcoal filter, which was adopted in January 1917, but was only issued in significant numbers from February 1918 onwards. By 11 November 1918, France had suffered 190,000 chemical warfare casualties, including 8,000 dead.

=== Tanks ===
In January 1916 Colonel Jean Baptiste Eugène Estienne persuaded Joffre to begin production of French tanks ("land ships"). An order for 400 Schneider CA1s and 400 Saint-Chamonds was soon placed. Their combat debut was when the French deployed 128 tanks on 16 April 1917 at Berry-au-Bac as part of the Second Battle of the Aisne. It was a painful experience. Their losses had indeed been heavy: 76 of the 128 combat tanks engaged had been lost. Many of these had burnt: 57 in total; most had been set on fire by German artillery. A quarter of the losses were where the tanks had broken down on the battlefield.

Given that General Estienne was listened to by the Grand Quartier Général (1914–1919) as well as by industrialists, he obtained agreement from Louis Renault (industrialist) that from July 1916 he would initiate the study of a light tank, faster but with a lighter armament. 150 of these machines were ordered on 22 February 1917, increased to 1,000 on the following 9 April after the first tests: mass production of the 6.7 tonne Renault FT was launched at the end of the year, with a single weapon mounted in the turret, a Hotchkiss model 1914 machine gun or a 37 mm SA 1918 gun (SA for "semi-automatic"). The first engagement of the Renault FT tanks took place in front of Saint-Pierre-Aigle on 31 May 1918, during the Third Battle of the Aisne.

== Uniforms ==
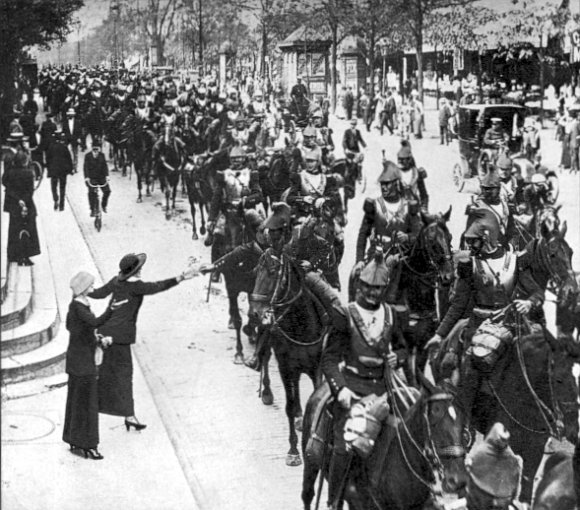
French cuirassiers on their way to the front in August 1914

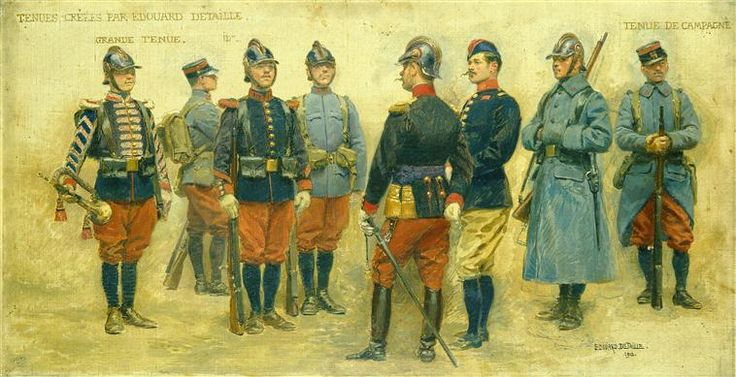
Test uniforms created in 1912 by Edouard Detaille for the line infantry. They were never adopted, but the blue-grey coats and the burgonet-style leather helmets influenced later uniforms

At the outbreak of war the French Army retained the colourful traditional uniforms of the nineteenth century for active service wear. These included conspicuous features such as blue coats and red trousers for the infantry and cavalry. The French cuirassiers wore plumed helmets and breastplates almost unchanged from the Napoleonic period. From 1903 on several attempts had been made to introduce a more practical field dress but these had been opposed by conservative opinion both within the army and amongst the public at large. In particular, the red trousers worn by the infantry became a political debating point. Adolphe Messimy who was briefly Minister of War in 1911-1912 stated that "This stupid blind attachment to the most visible of colours will have cruel consequences"; however, in the following year, one of his successors, Eugène Étienne, declared "Abolish red trousers? Never!"

In order to appease traditionalists, a new cloth was devised woven from red, white and blue threads, known as "Tricolour cloth", resulting in a drab purple-brown colour. However the red thread required a dye made in Germany, so that only the blue and white threads were finally used. The adoption of the blue-grey uniform (known as "horizon-blue" because it was thought to prevent soldiers from standing out against the skyline) had been approved by the French Chamber of Deputies on 10 July 1914 but new issues had not been possible before the outbreak of war a few weeks later.

The very heavy French losses during the Battle of the Frontiers could be attributed in part to the high visibility of the French uniforms, combined with peacetime training which placed emphasis on attacking in massed formations. The shortcomings of the uniforms were quickly realized and during the first quarter of 1915 general distribution of horizon-blue clothing in simplified patterns had been undertaken. The long established infantry practice of wearing greatcoats for field service, buttoned back to free the legs when on the march, was continued in the trenches. British-style puttees were issued in place of leather gaiters from October 1914.

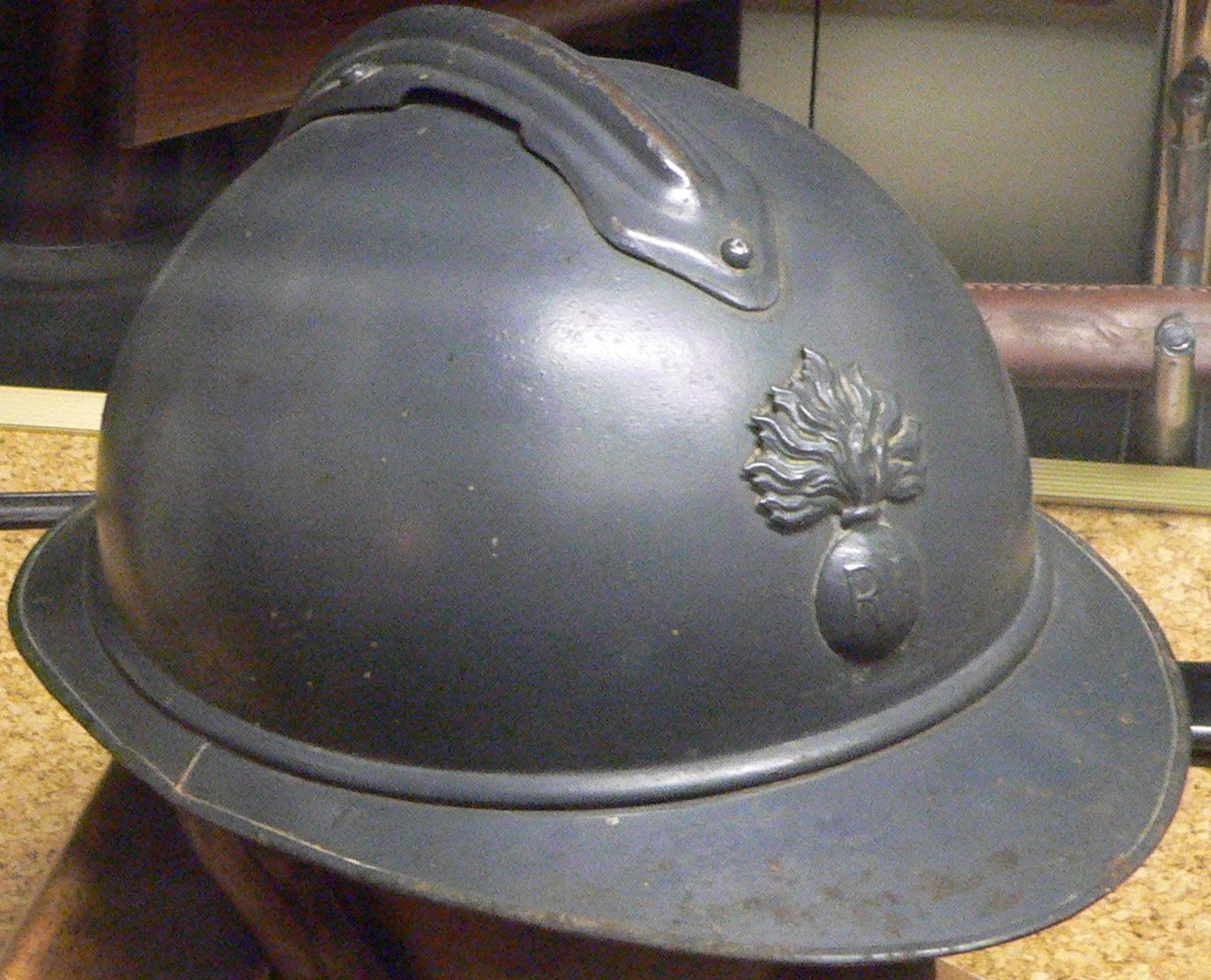
Modèle 1915 Adrian Helmet with infantry badge

The first months of the conflict show that 77% of the wounds received by soldiers were head wounds and in 80% of cases these wounds were fatal. To limit these injuries, skull caps were distributed from December 1914 to be placed under the kepi. On 21 February 1915, the War Ministry decided to order steel helmets. In April 1915, Colonel Adrian proposed a helmet made of three pieces of rolled steel 7 mm thick. The helmet was ordered in June 1915 and distributed from September onwards. The French Army was the first to introduce steel helmets for protection against shrapnel, and by December 1915 more than three million "Adrian" helmets had been manufactured.

The horizon-blue uniform and Adrian helmet proved sufficiently practical to be retained unchanged for the remainder of the war, although khaki of a shade described as "mustard" was introduced after December 1914 for the troops of the (North African) 19th Military District serving in France.

The French bonnet de police of the French Revolutionary Wars was reintroduced for undress or fatigue wear in 1891. In 1915 the bonnet de police (or "calot") generally replaced the kepi for other ranks during the remainder of the First World War, because of its greater convenience when the Adrian steel helmet was issued. A black floppy beret, known in soldier slang as a "tarte", given its similarity in appearance, had been worn by the chasseurs alpins (mountain troops) since 1889. From early 1915 to 1916 it was also issued to other units, in the same colour as their tunics, but was not popular, with most men preferring their trusty calot. A similar garment, the General Service Cap, was introduced to the British Army in the Second World War, and similarly fell out of favour.

== See also ==
- Military history of France
- French Army order of battle (1914)
- French POW publications of World War I
- French cavalry during World War I
- French artillery during World War I

== Gallery ==
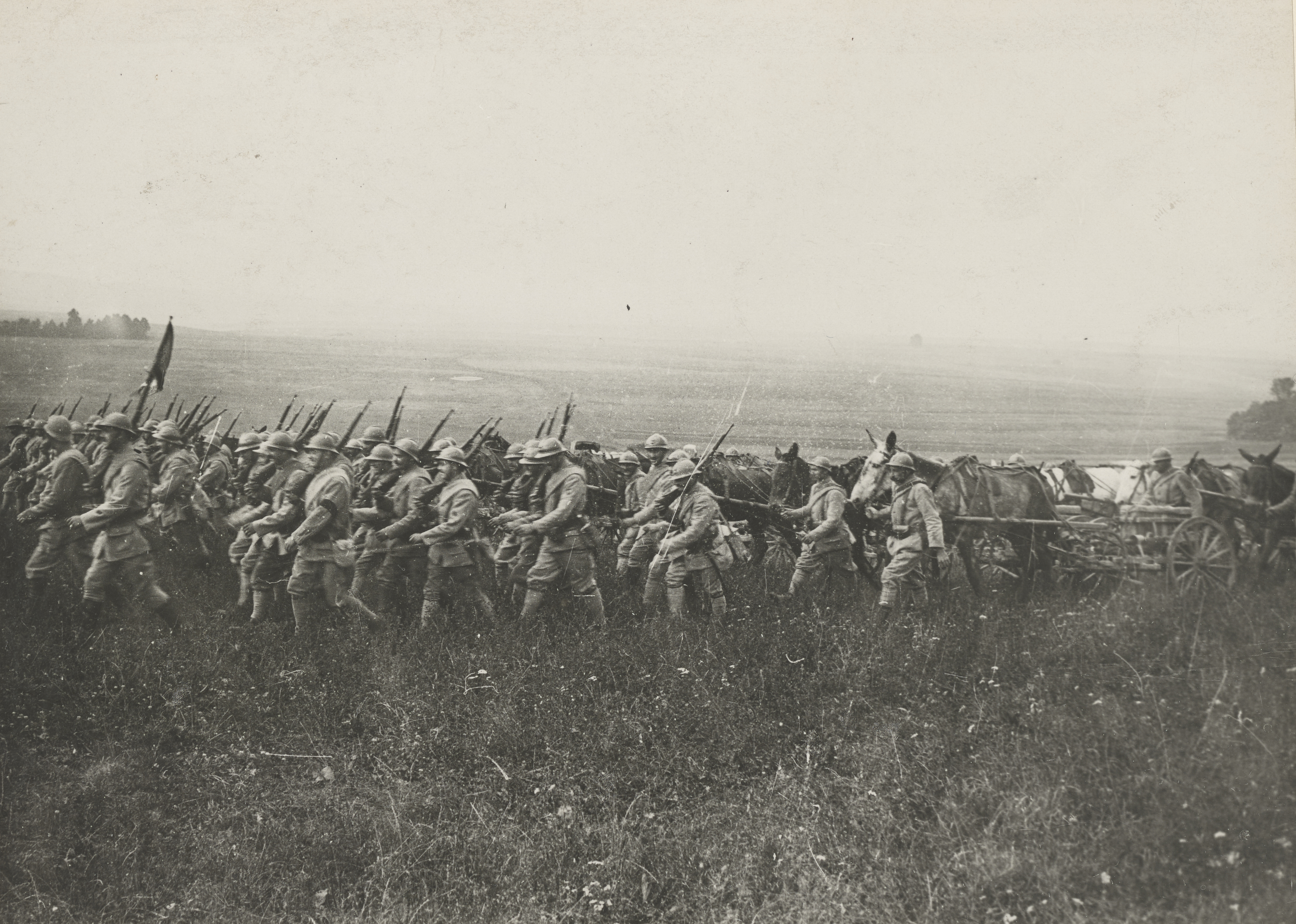
A French regiment on the march near the battlefield of the Oisne, 1918.

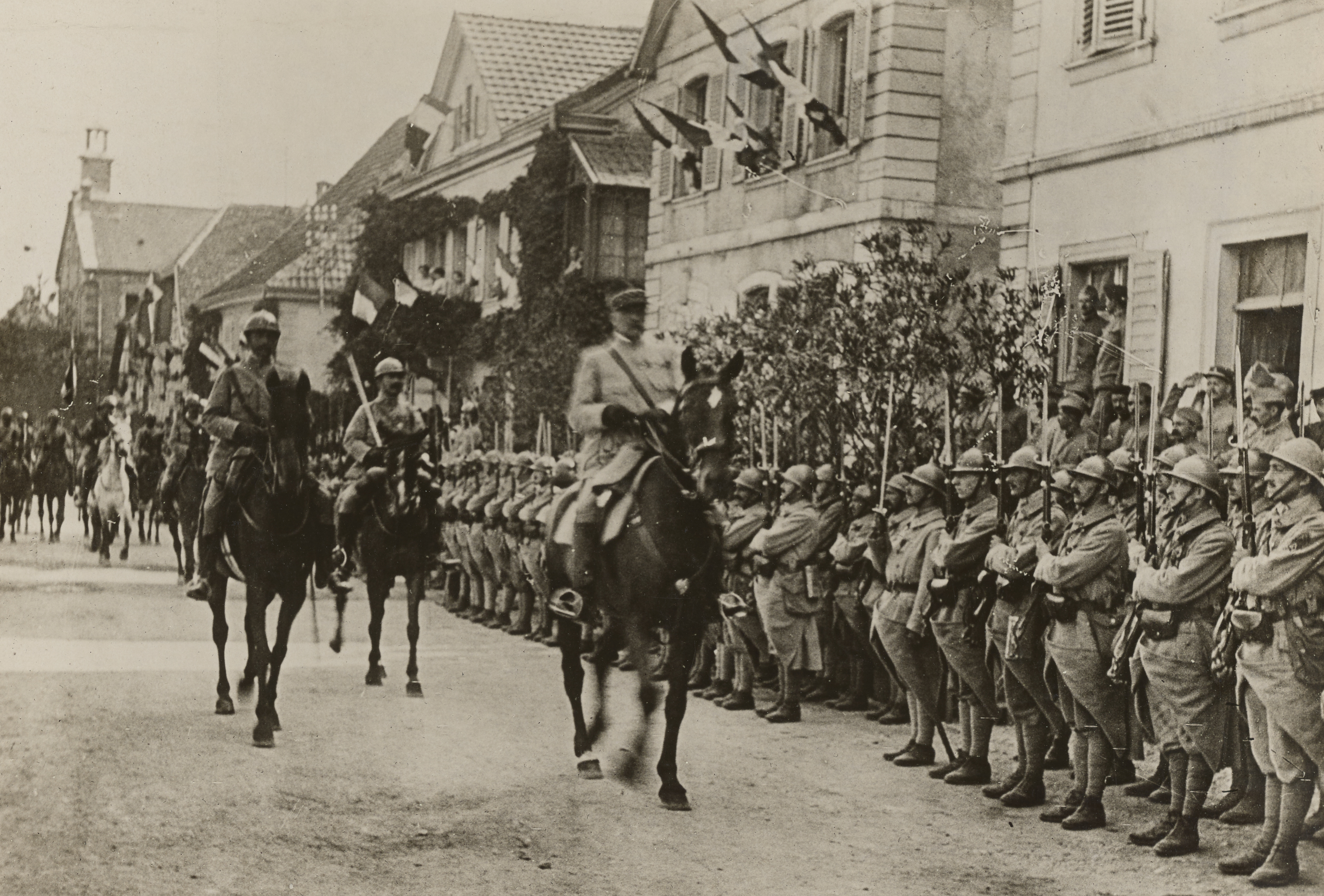
French general inspecting troops before they take up positions near the trenches occupied by American troops in the Vosges, France, 1918.

== Sources ==
- Les armées françaises dans la Grande guerre. Tome I. 1er Volume. Les préliminaires, La bataille des frontières. Ministère De la Guerre, Etat-Major de l'Armée - Service Historique (in French). Vol. Les préliminaires, La bataille des frontières. Paris: Imprimerie Nationale. 1936., available at Gallica
- Arras, Lens–Douai and the Battles of Artois. Michelin's Illustrated Guides to the Battlefields (1914–1918) (English ed.). Clermont-Ferrand: Michelin & Cie. 1919. OCLC 154114243.
- Clayton, Anthony (2003). Paths of glory: the French Army 1914-18. Cassell Military. ISBN 978-0-30-435949-3.
- Clodfelter, Micheal (2017). Warfare and Armed Conflicts: A Statistical Encyclopedia of Casualty and Other Figures, 1492-2015, 4th ed. Jefferson, NC: McFarland. ISBN 978-1-47-662585-0.
- Corrigan, Gordon (2012) [2003]. Mud, Blood & Poppycock. Cassell Military Paperback. Cassell. ISBN 978-0-3043-6659-0.
- Crocé, Eliane; Lefevre, Eric; Mabire, Ingrid (1986). Les Troupes de Marine 1622-1984 (in French). Paris: Charles-Lavauzelle. ISBN 978-2-70-250142-9.
- Doughty, R. A. (2005). Pyrrhic victory: French Strategy and Operations in the Great War. Cambridge, MA: Belknap Press. ISBN 978-0-674-01880-8.
- Edmonds, J. E. (1926). Military Operations France and Belgium 1914: Mons, the Retreat to the Seine, the Marne and the Aisne August–October 1914. History of the Great War Based on Official Documents by Direction of the Historical Section of the Committee of Imperial Defence. Vol. I (2nd ed.). London: Macmillan. OCLC 58962523.
- Edmonds, J. E. (1925). Military Operations France and Belgium, 1914: Antwerp, La Bassée, Armentières, Messines and Ypres October–November 1914. History of the Great War Based on Official Documents by Direction of the Historical Section of the Committee of Imperial Defence. Vol. II (1st ed.). London: Macmillan. OCLC 220044986.
- Foley, R. T. (2007) [2005]. German Strategy and the Path to Verdun: Erich Von Falkenhayn and the Development of Attrition, 1870–1916. Cambridge: CUP. ISBN 978-0-521-04436-3.
- François, Guy (2010). L'Artillerie de Côte Et l'Artillerie de Tranchée. Les Canons de la Victoire 1914-1918 volume 3 (in French). Paris: Histoire et Collections. ISBN 978-2-35250-161-9.
- Fromkin, David (2004). Europe's Last Summer: Who Started the Great War in 1914?. Knopf. ISBN 9780375411564.
- Goya, Michel (2018) [2004]. La chair et l'acier [Flesh and Steel during the Great War - The Transformation of the French Army and the Invention of Modern Warfare]. Translated by Uffindell, Andrew. Pen & Sword Military. ISBN 978-1-4738-8696-4.
- Greenhalgh, Elizabeth (2014). The French Army and the First World War. Armies of the Great War. Cambridge University Press. ISBN 978-1107605688.
- Ham, Paul (2014). 1914 The year the world ended. London: Transworld. ISBN 978-0-85-752236-8.
- Herwig, H. (2009). The Marne, 1914: The Opening of World War I and the Battle that Changed the World. New York: Random House. ISBN 978-1-4000-6671-1.
- Huré, Robert; De Nanteuil, Hugues de La Barre; Devautour, Paul; de Pradel de Lamaze, Jean-Marie (1977). L'Armée d'Afrique : 1830-1962 (in French). Paris: Charles-Lavauzelle. OCLC 757208988.
- Jagielski, Jean-François (9 October 2014). Loez, André (ed.). "Dossier pédagogique pour une visite au Chemin des Dames" (PDF). Casualty table for the Chemin des Dames 1917 (in French) – via CRID 14-18.
- Jouineau, André (2009b) [2009]. Officiers et soldats de l'armée française Tome 2 : 1915-1918 [Officers and Soldiers of the French Army Volume II: 1915-18]. Officers and Soldiers #12. Translated by McKay, Alan. Paris: Histoire & Collections. ISBN 978-2-35250-105-3.
- Krause, Jonathan (2013). "The Origins of Chemical Warfare in the French Army". War in History. 20 (4): 545–556. doi:10.1177/0968344513494659. hdl:2436/623660. JSTOR 26098246. S2CID 159845664.
- Mallinson, Allan (2014). 1914: Fight the Good Fight: Britain, the Army and the Coming of the First World War. London: Transworld. ISBN 978-0-85-750059-5.
- Mertz von Quirnheim, Hermann Ritter, ed. (1929). Der Weltkrieg 1914 bis 1918: Militärischen Operationen zu Lande, Fünfte Band, Der Herbst-Feldzug 1914: Im Osten bis zum Rückzug, Im Westen bis zum Stellungskrieg [The World War 1914–1918: Military Land Operations, Volume Five, The Autumn Campaign In the East and in the West, until the Withdrawal to Position Warfare]. Vol. V (online scan [2012] ed.). Berlin: Verlag Ernst Siegfried Mittler & Sohn. OCLC 838299944 – via Die Digitale Landesbibliothek Oberösterreich.
- Mirouze, Laurent, ed. (2007). The French Army in the First World War Volume I - to battle 1914. Vienna: Verlag Militaria. ISBN 978-2-9515171-0-3.
- Mirouze, Laurent, ed. (2008). The French Army in the First World War Volume II - 1914 to 1918 Uniforms - Equipment - Armament. Vienna: Verlag Militaria. ISBN 978-3-90-252620-5.
- Mollo, John (1972). Military Fashion: A Comparative History of the Great Armies From the 17th Century to the First World War. Barrie & Jenkins. ISBN 978-0-21-465349-0.
- Nicholson, G. W. L. (1962). Canadian Expeditionary Force 1914–1919 (PDF). Official History of the Canadian Army in the First World War. Ottawa: Queen's Printer and Controller of Stationery. OCLC 59609928. Archived from the original (PDF) on 26 August 2011.
- Ortholan, Henri; Verney, Jean-Pierre (2004). L'armée française de l'été 1914 (in French). Paris: Bernard Giovanangeli & Ministère de la Défense. ISBN 2-909034-48-8.
- Phillipi, Didier (2020). L'histoire des Troupes de Marine au travers de L'uniforme 1622 - 2020. Histoire & collections. p. 78. ISBN 979-10-380-1001-7.
- Pompé, Daniel; et al., eds. (1924). Les armées françaises dans la Grande guerre. Tome X. 1er Volume. Ordres de bataille des grandes unités - Groupes D'Armées, Armées, Corps d'Armées. Ministère De la Guerre, Etat-Major de l'Armée - Service Historique (in French) (1st ed.). Paris: Imprimerie Nationale.
- La revue d'infanterie. Ministère de la Guerre (in French). Vol. 332. Paris: Henri Charles-Lavauzelle. 1920., available at Gallica.
- Sheldon, J. (2010). The German Army at Ypres 1914 (1st ed.). Barnsley: Pen and Sword Military. ISBN 978-1-84884-113-0.
- Stevenson, David (2012). 1914-1918: The History of the First World War. Penguin. ISBN 978-0718197957.
- Strachan, H. (2001). The First World War: To Arms. Vol. I. Oxford: OUP. ISBN 978-0-19-926191-8.
- Sumner, Ian (2009). French Poilu 1914–18. Warrior. Oxford: Osprey. ISBN 978-1846033322.
- Sumner, Ian (2012). They Shall Not Pass: The French Army on the Western Front 1914–1918. Barnsley: Pen & Sword Military. ISBN 978-1848842090.
- Thomas, Nigel (25 July 2001). Armies in the Balkans 1914-18. Bloomsbury USA. p. 20. ISBN 1-84176-194-X.
- Touzin, Pierre; Vauvillier, François (2009). Les Matériels de l'Armée Française: Les canons de la victoire, 1914–1918. Tome 1: L'Artillerie de Campagne. Paris: Histoire et Collections. ISBN 978-2-35250-022-3.
- Simkins, Peter (2013). The First World War: the war to end all wars. Osprey Publishing. ISBN 978-1782002802.
- Zuber, T. (2009) [2007]. The Battle of the Frontiers: Ardennes 1914. Stroud, Gloucestershire: The History Press. ISBN 978-0-7524-5255-5.
