= Guy Pedroncini =

French academic and military historian

Guy Pedroncini (1924–2006) was a French academic and military historian specialising in the First World War, and notable as the biographer of Philippe Pétain and for his work on the French army mutinies of 1917. He was born in Paris on 17 May 1924 and died on 11 July 2006, at the age of 82.

An alumnus of the prestigious École Normale Supérieure at Saint-Cloud, Pedroncini worked as a high school teacher in lycées in Tours and in Courbevoie while working on his doctoral thesis. This thesis, on the French army mutinies of 1917, was published in 1967 and was the first to provide detailed statistical analysis of more than 600 courts martial, based on his then unprecedented access to the French military justice archives. Between 1969 and his retirement in 1992, Pedroncini held professorial and decanal posts at the universities of the Sorbonne, Panthéon-Sorbonne in Paris and the University of Maine, Le Mans. He was director of the Institut d'Histoire des conflits contemporains, from 1983 to 1995, and publisher of the Revue des guerres mondiales et des conflits contemporains from 1985 to 1997.

== Bibliography ==
- Les Mutineries de 1917 [1967] Presses Universitaires de France (Series: Publications de la Sorbonne) (Reprinted 1999). ISBN 978-2-13-047375-6
- 1917, les mutineries de l'armée française. Julliard (1968).
- Les Négociations secrètes pendant la Grande Guerre. Paris: Flammarion (1969).
- Le Haut Commandement français et la conduite de la guerre 1917-1918. Paris: Flammarion (1971).
- Pétain, général en chef 1917-1918 [1974]. Presses Universitaires de France (1997). ISBN 978-2-13-048429-5
- Pétain, le soldat et la gloire. Paris: Perrin (1989). ISBN 2-262-00628-8
- Journal du Maréchal Joffre. Service Historique de l'Armée de Terre (1990). ISBN 978-2-86323-065-7
- Pétain, la victoire perdue 1918-1940. Paris: Perrin (1995). ISBN 978-2-262-01083-6
- Histoire militaire de la France. Tome 3. Quadrige (1995). ISBN 978-2-13-048908-5
- Des étoiles et des croix. Economica (1995). ISBN 978-2-7178-2810-8
- L'émergence des armes nouvelles 1914-1918 (with Claude Carlier). Economica (1997) (Series: Hautes études militaires) ISBN 978-2-7178-3309-6
- La bataille de Verdun (with Claude Carlier). Economica (1997). ISBN 978-2-7178-3254-9
- Pétain, le soldat 1914-1940. Perrin (1998). ISBN 978-2-262-01386-8
- Les poilus ont la parole (with Jean Nicot and André Bach). Éditions Complexe (1998). ISBN 978-2-87027-728-7
- La Grande Guerre d'un lieutenant d'artillerie. Carnets de guerre de 1914 à 1919 (with Pierre Grison). L'Harmattan (2000). ISBN 978-2-7384-7810-8
- La défense sous la troisième république, 1 : Vaincre la défaite, 1872-1881. 1. Armée de terre (2000). Pub: Service Historique de l'Armée de Terre. ISBN 978-2-86323-051-0
