= 1917 French Army mutinies =

Failed uprising in France during WWI

- Part of the revolutions of 1917–1923
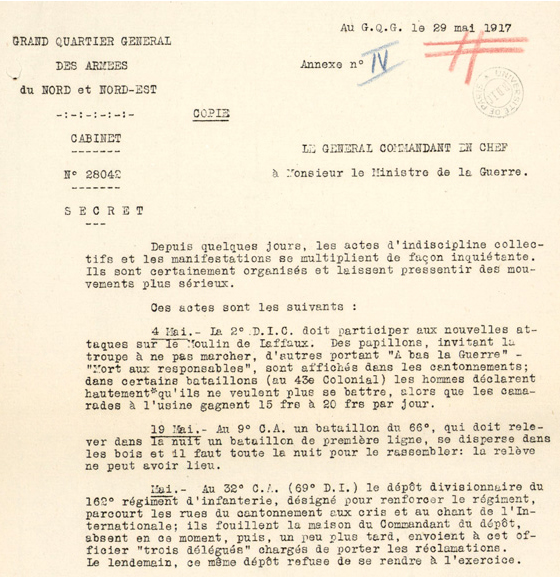
- Letter from General Pétain to the Minister of War on the mutinies
- Date: 25 April – 8 June 1917
- Location: France
- Caused by: World War I: Nivelle Offensive; Second Battle of the Aisne

Parties
French Third Republic	French Army mutineers

The 1917 French Army mutinies took place on the Western Front in northern France during the First World War. The mutinies started just after the unsuccessful and costly Second Battle of the Aisne, the main action in the April 1917 Nivelle offensive. The new commander of the armies in France, General Robert Nivelle, had promised a decisive victory over the German Empire within 48 hours. Morale in the French Army rose to a great height and the shock of failure soured its mood overnight.

The mutinies and the associated disruptions involved, to various degrees, nearly half of the French infantry divisions stationed on the Western Front. The term "mutiny" does not precisely describe events since the soldiers remained in the trenches and were willing to defend but refused orders to attack. Nivelle was sacked and replaced by General Philippe Pétain, who restored morale by talking to the men, promising no more suicidal attacks, providing rest and leave for exhausted units and moderating discipline. He held 3,400 courts-martial in which 554 mutineers were sentenced to death and 26 were executed.

The catalysts for the mutinies were the extreme optimism and the dashed hopes of the Nivelle offensive; pacifism, which was stimulated by the February Revolution in Russia, the trade union movement and disappointment at the non-arrival of the American Expeditionary Forces. The French soldiers on the front had unrealistically expected the Americans to arrive within days of their declaration of war.

== Background ==
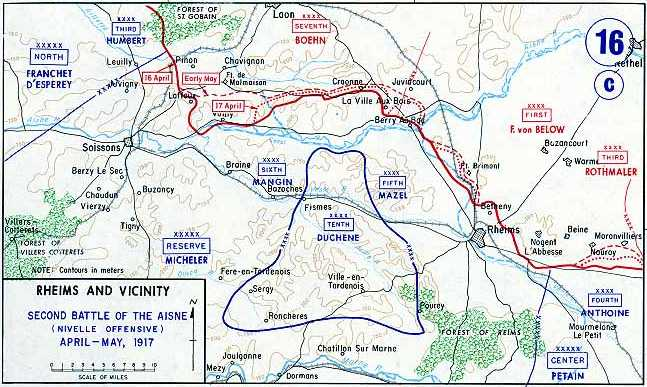
The Aisne front in 1917, the site of the Nivelle offensive.

More than one million French soldiers (306,000 in 1914, 334,000 in 1915, 287,000 in 1916, 121,000 in early 1917), out of a population of twenty million males of all ages, had been killed in fighting by early 1917. The losses had weakened the French will to attack.

In April 1917, General Robert Nivelle promised a war-winning decisive victory. He proposed to work closely with the British Army to break through the German Empire lines on the Western Front by a great attack against the German-occupied Chemin des Dames, a long and prominent ridge that runs east to west, just north of the Aisne River. Nivelle applied a tactic that he had used with success at the First and Second Offensive during the Battle of Verdun in October and December 1916, a creeping barrage in which the French artillery fired its shells to land just in front of the advancing infantry to keep the Germans under cover until they had been overrun.

Nivelle's attack, the Second Battle of the Aisne, failed to achieve its main war-winning objective. At the cost of very high casualties, the offensive exhausted the German reserves and conquered some tactically important positions. A French tank attack had also been launched near Berry-au-Bac, but half of the Schneider CA1 tanks engaged were knocked out. Nivelle was removed from his command on 15 May 1917 and was replaced by General Philippe Pétain.

A similar battle would have been considered a draw in 1915, but the huge losses at the Battle of Verdun and the Battle of the Somme caused the psychology of the soldiers to be fragile in 1917. The strategic failure and the casualties caused a collapse in the morale of the French infantrymen, who had been so enthusiastic just a few days earlier. However, the United States entered the war in April 1917, which was met with euphoria in France.

== Mutinies ==
The Nivelle Offensive failed to achieve its strategic objectives, and by 25 April, most of the fighting had ended. On 3 May, the French 2nd Division refused to follow orders to attack, and the mutiny soon spread throughout the army. For most of the time, events were independent from one another and focused on specific demands: more liberty, more time with families and better conditions in the cantonments.

From 16 to 17 May, there were disturbances in a chasseur battalion of the 127th Division and a regiment of the 18th Division. Two days later, a battalion of the 166th Division staged a demonstration, and on 20 May, the 128th Regiment of the 3rd Division and the 66th Regiment of the 18th Division refused orders. Individual incidents of insubordination occurred in the 17th Division.

Over the next two days, spokesmen were elected in two regiments of the 69th Division to petition for an end to the offensive. By 28 May, mutinies broke out in the 9th Division, 158th Division, 5th Division and the 1st Cavalry Division. By the end of May, more units of the 5th, 6th, 13th, 35th, 43rd, 62nd, 77th and 170th Divisions had mutinied, and revolts occurred in 21 divisions in May. A record 27,000 French soldiers deserted in 1917; the offensive was suspended on 9 May.

Even in regiments in which there was direct confrontation, such as the 74th Infantry Regiment, the men did not harm their officers but refused to attack. Most mutineers were veterans who did not refuse to fight but wanted the military authorities to be more attentive to the realities of modern war. The soldiers had come to believe that the attacks that they were ordered to make were futile. News on the February Revolution in Russia was being published in French socialist newspapers, and anonymous pacifist propaganda leaflets were very widely distributed. In Soissons, Villers-Cotterêts, Fère-en-Tardenois and Cœuvres-et-Valsery, troops refused orders or to go to the front. On 1 June, a French infantry regiment took over the town of Missy-aux-Bois. Tony Ashworth wrote that the mutinies were "widespread and persistent" and involved more than half the divisions in the French army. On 7 June, Pétain told British commander Sir Douglas Haig that two French divisions had refused to relieve two divisions in the front line.

In 1967, Guy Pedroncini examined French military archives and discovered that 49 infantry divisions had been destabilised and experienced episodes of mutiny. Of the 49, 9 divisions were gravely affected by mutinous behaviour, 15 were seriously affected and 25 were affected by isolated but repeated instances of mutinous behaviour. Altogether, 43% of the 113 infantry divisions of the army had been affected by the end of 1917. The crisis of morale occurred mainly in the infantry, which had borne the brunt of casualties. Branches such as the heavy artillery, which was located far behind the front lines, and the cavalry units that was were mounted remained unaffected by the mutinies and provided detachments to round up deserters and to restore order. Only 12 field artillery regiments were affected by the crisis of indiscipline.

== Repression ==
On 8 June, the military authorities took swift and decisive action: mass arrests were followed by mass trials. Those arrested were selected by their own officers and NCOs, with the implicit consent of the rank and file. There were 3,427 conseils de guerre (courts-martial). In 1967, research by Pedroncini found 2,878 sentences of hard labour and 629 death sentences, of which only 26 were carried out. The relative lack of rigour in repressing the mutinies provoked adverse reactions from some French divisional commanders. Pétain and French President Raymond Poincaré, on the other hand, made it their policy to mend the French Army's morale and to avoid acting in a way that could aggravate its losses.

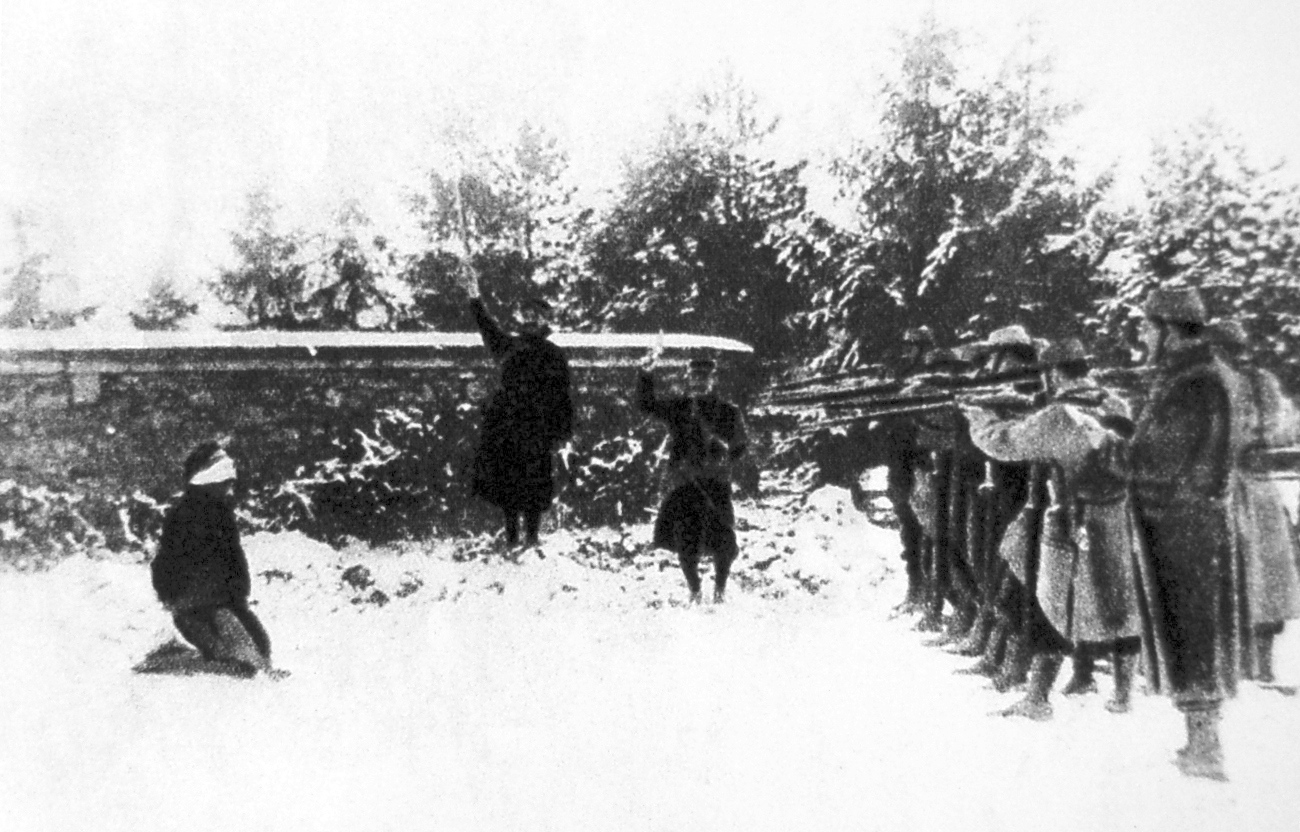
A possible execution at Verdun during the 1917 mutinies. The original French text that accompanies the photograph notes that the uniforms are those of 1914/15 and that the execution may be that of a spy at the beginning of the war.

When the news of February Revolution and of the abdication of Tsar Nicholas II reached France, there were some demonstrations by Russian units in France. When an order from Russia to elect soviets was received on 16 April, the French Army whisked the Russians away from the front and moved them to central France. The Russians put on a large May Day parade and then mutinied. The 1st Russian Brigade was encircled by loyal Russian troops in September 1917 at camp de La Courtine and bombarded with artillery, which killed 8 men and wounded 28. That episode became the basis of widespread false rumours that the French had bombarded their own units. The Russian troops (about 10,000 men) were demobilised and transferred to labour battalions, and the ringleaders were sent to North Africa in penal servitude.

Along with the deterrent of military justice, Pétain offered more regular and longer leave and an end to grand offensives "until the arrival of tanks and Americans on the front". It was feared that infantry offensives could never prevail over the fire of machine-guns and artillery. Pétain restored morale by a combination of rest periods, frequent rotations of the front-line units and regular home furloughs.

== Aftermath ==
=== Analysis ===
The most persistent episodes of collective indiscipline involved a relatively small number of French divisions; the mutinies did not threaten a complete military collapse. Because of the low morale in more than half of the French Army, it took until the early months of 1918 for the French Army to recover fully. Because of the mutinies, the Grand Quartier Général, the French High Command, became reluctant to begin another offensive. Pétain's strategy in late 1917 was to wait for the deployment of the American Expeditionary Forces and for the introduction of the new and highly effective Renault FT tanks: J'attends les chars et les Américains ("I am waiting for the tanks and the Americans"). He had the support of Georges Clemenceau, who told President Woodrow Wilson in June 1917 that France planned "to wait for the Americans & meanwhile not lose more.... I like Pétain... just because he won't attack". Martin Evans wrote that "the French army would sit tight and wait for the Americans". Christopher Andrew and Christopher Andrew and A. S. Kanya-Forster wrote in 1981, "Even after Petain's skilful mixture of tact and firmness had restored military discipline, the French army could only remain on the defensive and wait for the Americans".

When the Americans arrived in France in the spring of 1917, they were inexperienced. The US generals had orders not to accept responsibility for military zones and to "understudy" the British. That meant that for the summer and the autumn of 1917, British troops had to take over the zones that the French had vacated and also to teach American troops. The British tried to reinvigorate French morale by launching the Third Battle of Ypres, with varied success, but it pertinently relieved pressure on the French, to the south. It was not until early 1918, when the US troops had completed their preparations for war, that French morale improved. The Allies withstood the German spring offensive and, in the Hundred Days Offensive, comprehensively defeated the German Army, which, with the British naval blockade of Germany, paid dividends. Starved of food, Germany collapsed on the home front. Its leadership was compelled to sue for peace, as the army and the front were quickly pushed back.

=== History ===
The French government suppressed news of the mutinies to avoid alerting the Germans or harming morale on the home front. The extent and the intensity of the mutinies were disclosed for the first time only in 1967 by Pedroncini in his Les mutineries de 1917. His project had been made possible by the opening of most of the military archives fifty years after the events, a delay that was in conformity with French War Ministry procedure. There were still undisclosed archives on the mutinies in the 21st century, which were believed to contain documents mostly of a political nature. They were not to be opened to researchers until 100 years after the mutinies, in 2017.

Leonard Smith argued that the mutinies were akin to labour strikes and could be considered, at least partly, to be political in nature. The soldiers demanded more leave, better food and the end of the use of colonial workers on the home front. They were also deeply concerned about the welfare of their families. The rather subdued repression, according to Smith, was part of Pétain's policy of appeasement. Concurrently, the policy saved the appearance of absolute authority exercised by the Grand Quartier Général. Smith placed the mutinies into their wider ideological context and demonstrated the extent to which the French soldiers and mutineers had accepted the main tenets of republican ideology.

== See also ==
- Étaples Mutiny (September 1917)
- Paths of Glory (1957 film)

== Bibliography ==
- Andrew, Christopher M.; Kanya-Forstner, Alexander Sydney (1981). The Climax of French Imperial Expansion, 1914–1924. Stanford, CA: Stanford University Press. ISBN 978-0-8047-1101-2.
- Ashworth, Tony (2000). Trench Warfare, 1914–18: The Live and Let Live System. Grand Strategy. London: Pan. ISBN 978-0-330-48068-0.
- Blake, Robert, ed. (1952). The Private Papers of Douglas Haig, 1914–1918. London: Eyre & Spottiswoode. OCLC 1019214627.
- Buffetaut, Yves (2000). Votre ancêtre dans la Grande Guerre [Your Forefather in the First World War] (in French). Louviers: Ysec Editions. ISBN 2-9513423-2-2.
- Evans, Martin (2014). France 1815–2003: Modern History For Modern Languages. London: Routledge. ISBN 978-1-4441-1903-9.
- French, David (1991). "Watching the Allies: British Intelligence and the French Mutinies of 1917". Intelligence & National Security. VI (3). ISSN 0268-4527.
- Gilbert, Bentley B.; Bernard, Paul P. (1959). "The French Army Mutinies of 1917". The Historian. XXII (1). London: Taylor & Francis. ISSN 0018-2370.
- Gilbert, Martin (1995). First World War (pbk. ed.). London: HarperCollins. ISBN 978-0-00-637666-8.
- Greenhalgh, Elizabeth (2014). The French Army and the First World War. Cambridge: Cambridge University Press. ISBN 978-1-107-60568-8.
- Keegan, John (1998). The First World War. London: Hutchinson. ISBN 978-0-09-180178-6.
- Meyer, G. J. (2007). A World Undone: The Story of the Great War, 1914 to 1918 (Delta trade pbk. ed.). New York: Bantam Dell. ISBN 978-0-553-38240-2.
- Millman, Brock (2014). Pessimism and British War Policy, 1916–1918. London: Routledge. ISBN 978-1-135-26950-0.
- Mondet, Arlette Estienne (2011). Le général J. B. E. Estienne - père des chars: Des chenilles et des ailes [General J. B.E. Estienne - Father of tanks, Caterpillars and Wings]. Editions L'Harmattan. ISBN 978-2-296-44757-8.
- Neiberg, Michael S. (2003). Foch: Supreme Allied Commander in the Great War. Washington DC: Brassey's. ISBN 978-1-57488-551-4.
- Pedroncini, Guy (1983). Les mutineries de 1917 [The Mutinies of 1917] (in French) (2nd ed.). Paris: Publications de la Sorbonne, Presse Universitaires de France. ISBN 2-13-038092-1.
- Poitevin, Pierre (1938). La mutinerie de La Courtine: les régiments russes révoltés en 1917 au centre de la France [The Mutiny of La Courtine: The Rebellion of the Russian Regiments in 1917 in Central France]. Collection de mémoires, études et documents pour servir à l'histoire de la guerre mondiale (in French). Paris: Editions Payot. OCLC 715735154.
- Simkins, Peter; Jukes, Geoffrey; Hickey, Michael (1983). The First World War: The War To End All Wars. Oxford: Osprey. ISBN 1-84176-738-7.
- Smith, Leonard V. (1995). "War and 'Politics': The French Army Mutinies of 1917". War in History. II (2). New York: Sage: 180–201. ISSN 0968-3445.
- Stovall, Tyler (2015). Transnational France: The Modern History of a Universal Nation. Boulder, CO: Westview Press. ISBN 978-0-8133-4812-4.
- Strachan, H. (2003). The First World War: To Arms. Vol. I (pbk. repr. ed.). New York: Oxford University Press. ISBN 978-0-19-926191-8.
- Terraine, J. (1977). The Road to Passchendaele: The Flanders Offensive 1917, A Study in Inevitability. London: Leo Cooper. ISBN 978-0-436-51732-7.
- Wynne, G. C. (1976) [1939]. If Germany Attacks: The Battle in Depth in the West (facs. repr. Greenwood Press, Westport, CT. ed.). Cambridge: Clarendon Press. ISBN 978-0-8371-5029-1.
