= French POW publications of World War I =

A number of newspapers were produced by French prisoners in POW camps in Germany during World War I. Argus (1917) lists six such publications: Canard (Nürnberg), l'Écho des Baraques (Zwickau), Exilé (Hammelburg), Intermède (Würzburg), Le Camp de Göttingen (Göttingen) and Les Camps d'Allemagne (published from Göttingen, with news from Cassel camp as well).
