= Nivelle offensive =

Indecisive Franco-British operation on the Western Front during the First World War

- Part of the Western Front of the First World War
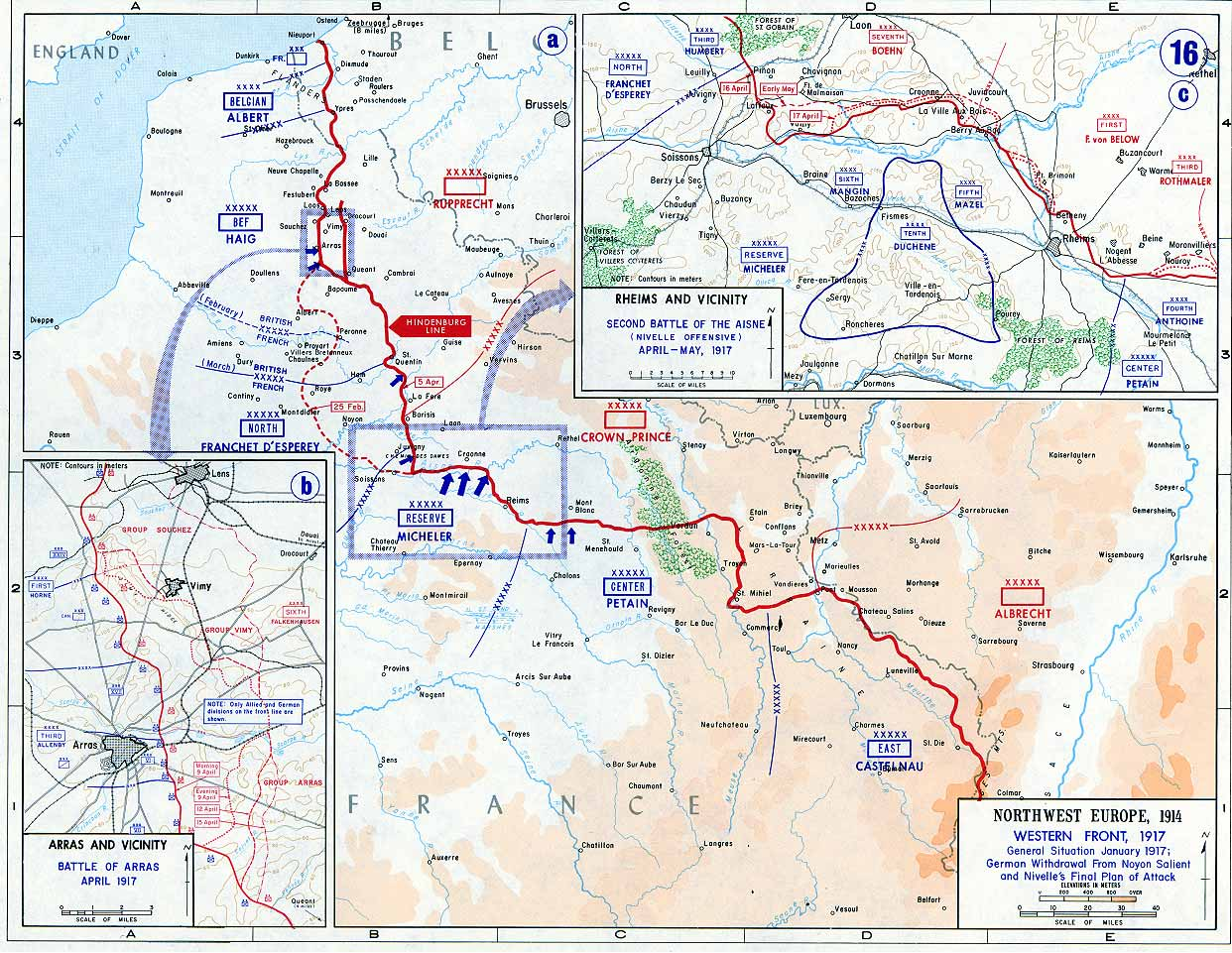
- The Western Front, 1917
Date	16 April – 9 May 1917
Location	Northern France 49°30′N 03°30′E
Result	Indecisive

Belligerents
France; United Kingdom; (Russian Empire) Russia	Germany

Commanders and leaders
(French Third Republic) Robert Nivelle; (United Kingdom of Great Britain and Ireland) Douglas Haig	(German Empire) Erich Ludendorff; (German Empire) Crown Prince Wilhelm

Strength
850,000 troops; 7,000 guns, 128 tanks	c. 480,000 troops

Casualties and losses
French: 187,000; Russian: 5,183; 32 tanks	c. 163,000; (15,000–20,780 POW)

The Nivelle offensive (16 April – 9 May 1917) was a Franco-British operation on the Western Front in the First World War that led to mutinies in the French Army. The offensive was named after General Robert Nivelle, the commander-in-chief of the French metropolitan armies. The French part of the offensive was intended to be decisive by breaking through the German defences on the Aisne front within 48 hours, with casualties expected to be around 10,000 men. A preliminary attack was to be made by the French Third Army at St Quentin and the British First, Third and Fifth armies at Arras, to capture high ground and divert German reserves from the French on the Aisne and in Champagne. The main offensive was to be delivered by the French on the Chemin des Dames ridge (the Second Battle of the Aisne). (Note: La bataille du Chemin des Dames, Seconde bataille de l'Aisne and Doppelschlacht Aisne-Champagne.) A subsidiary attack was to be made by the Fourth Army (the Third Battle of Champagne). (Note: Also the Battle of the Hills or the Battle of the Hills of Champagne.) The final stage of the offensive was to follow the meeting of the British and French armies, having broken through the German lines, to pursue the defeated German armies towards the German frontier.

The Franco-British attacks were tactically successful; the French Third Army of Groupe d'armées du Nord (GAN, Northern Army Group) captured the German defences west of the Hindenburg Line (Siegfriedstellung) near St Quentin from 1 to 4 April, before further attacks were repulsed. The British Third and First armies achieved the deepest advance since trench warfare began, along the Scarpe river in the Battle of Arras, which inflicted many casualties on the Germans, attracted reserves and (specifically the four Canadian divisions of the First Army) captured Vimy Ridge to the north. The main French offensive on the Aisne began on 16 April and also achieved considerable tactical success but the attempt to force a strategically decisive battle on the Germans was a costly failure and by 25 April the main offensive had been suspended.

The failure of the Nivelle strategy and the high number of French casualties led to mutinies, the dismissal of Nivelle, his replacement by Philippe Pétain and the adoption of a defensive strategy by the French, while their armies recuperated and rearmed. Fighting known as the Battle of the Observatories continued for local advantage all summer on the Chemin des Dames and along the Moronvilliers heights east of Reims. In late October, the French conducted the Battle of La Malmaison (23–27 October), a limited-objective attack on the west end of the Chemin-des-Dames, which forced the Germans to abandon their remaining positions on the ridge and retire across the Ailette valley. The British remained on the offensive for the rest of the year fighting the battles of Messines, 3rd Ypres and Cambrai.

== Background ==
=== Strategic developments ===
After the costly fighting at Verdun and on the Somme in 1916, General Robert Nivelle replaced Marshal Joseph Joffre as the commander of the French armies on the Western Front in December. Nivelle claimed that a massive barrage on German lines would bring France victory in 48 hours. The Russian Revolution, the German withdrawal to the Hindenburg Line and the likelihood of a declaration of war by the US, made some assumptions of the plan obsolete. At a meeting on 6 April, despite the doubts of other politicians, the army group commanders and the British, Alexandre Ribot, the new French Prime Minister supported the plan. Nivelle offered his resignation but it was refused, despite Nivelle's authority having been undermined. Preparing the Nivelle Offensive was a huge and costly undertaking, involving c. 1.2 million troops and 7,000 artillery pieces on a front between Reims and Roye. The principal effort was an attack on the German positions along the Chemin des Dames ridge, in the Second Battle of the Aisne and an eventual link with the British. The plan had been in development since December 1916 but the preparations were plagued by delays and information leaks. By April 1917, the plans were well known to the German army, which made extensive defensive preparations, by adding fortifications to the Aisne front and reinforcing the 7th Army (General der Infanterie Max von Boehn) with divisions released by the retreat to the Hindenburg Line in Operation Alberich.

== Prelude ==
=== Franco-British preparations ===
Nivelle left Petain in command of Groupe d'armées de Centre (GAC) and established a new Groupe d'armées de Reserve (GAR, Joseph Micheler) for the attack along the Chemin des Dames with the Fifth Army (General Olivier Mazel), the Sixth Army (General Charles Mangin) and the Tenth Army (General Denis Duchêne). Forty-nine infantry and five cavalry divisions were massed on the Aisne front with 5,300 guns. The ground at Brimont began to rise to the west towards Craonne and then reached a height of 180 m (590 ft) along a plateau which continued westwards to Fort Malmaison. The French held a bridgehead 20 km (12 mi) wide on the north bank of the Aisne, south of the Chemin des Dames, from Berry-au-Bac to Fort Condé on the road to Soissons.

=== German preparations ===
German air reconnaissance was possible close to the front although longer-range sorties were impossible to protect because of the greater number of Allied aircraft. The qualitative superiority of German fighters enabled German air observers on short-range sorties to detect British preparations for an attack on both sides of the Scarpe; accommodation for 150,000 men was identified in reconnaissance photographs. On 6 April a division was seen encamped near Arras, troop and transport columns crowded the streets while more narrow-gauge railways and artillery were seen to have moved closer to the front. British aerial activity opposite the 6th Army greatly increased and by 6 April Ludendorff was certain that an attack was imminent. By early April German air reinforcements had arrived at the Arras front, telephone networks had been completed and a common communications system for the air and ground forces built.

On the Aisne front, German intelligence had warned that an attack on 15 April against German airfields and observation balloons by the Aéronautique Militaire was planned. The Luftstreitkräfte arranged to meet the attack but it was cancelled. Dawn reconnaissance had been ordered to scrutinise French preparations and they gave the first warning of an attack on 16 April. German artillery-observation aircraft crews were able to range guns on terrain features, areas and targets before the offensive began so that the positions of the heaviest French guns, advanced batteries and areas not under French bombardment could be reported quickly along with the accuracy of German return-fire. Ground communication with the German artillery was made more reliable by running telephone lines along steep slopes and deep valleys which were relatively free of French artillery-fire; wireless control stations had been set up during the winter to link aircraft to the guns.

=== Morale ===
Verdun cost the French nearly 400,000 casualties and the conditions undermined morale, leading to a number of incidents of indiscipline. Although relatively minor, they reflected a belief among the rank and file that their sacrifices were not appreciated by their government or senior officers. Combatants on both sides claimed the battle was the most psychologically exhausting of the war; recognising this, Pétain frequently rotated divisions, in a process known as the noria system. While this ensured units were withdrawn before their ability to fight was significantly eroded, it meant that a high proportion of the French army fought in the battle. By the beginning of 1917, French morale was questionable, even in divisions with good combat records.

== Battle ==
=== St. Quentin–Arras ===
Groupe d'armées du Nord on the northern flank of Groupe d'armées de Reserve (GAR) had been reduced to one army with three corps and began French operations with preliminary attacks by the Third Army on German observation points at St. Quentin on 1–4, 10 and 13 April, which took some of the German defences in front of the Siegfriedstellung (Hindenburg Line) in preliminary operations. The main attack on 13 April made very little progress, against a German defence relying mainly on machine-gun fire and local counter-attacks. On 9 April the British Third Army attacked to the east of Arras from Croisilles to Ecurie, against Observation Ridge, north of the Arras–Cambrai road and then towards Feuchy and the German second and third lines. To the south of the road the initial objective was Devil's Wood to Tilloy-lès-Mofflaines and Bois des Boeufs, with a final objective of the Monchyriegel (Monchy switch line) between Wancourt and Feuchy. The Third Army attack on the German defences either side of the Scarpe river penetrated 6,000 yd (3.4 mi; 5.5 km), the furthest advance achieved since the beginning of trench warfare. Most of the objectives had been reached by the evening of 10 April, except for the line between Wancourt and Feuchy around Neuville-Vitasse. The village fell that day, although the German garrisons in some parts of Monchyriegel held out for several more days. The Third Army consolidated and then advanced on Monchy-le-Preux.

To the north the First Army attacked from Ecurie north of the Scarpe to Vimy Ridge. The crest of the ridge was captured at about 1:00 p.m. in an advance which penetrated about 4,000 yd (2.3 mi; 3.7 km) during the day. German reserves had been held too far back from the front and did not begin to reach the battlefield until the evening, when they were able only to reinforce the survivors of the front defences in improvised positions. The British engaged in several general attacks and limited attacks, which took more ground but became increasingly costly, against a German defence which recovered from the defeats of 9 April and organised reverse-slope defences, which were much easier to hold. By 16 May the British had made significant advances and captured 254 German guns but had been unable to achieve a breakthrough. New tactics had been used, particularly in the first phase and had demonstrated that set-piece assaults against elaborately fortified positions could be successful.

=== Chemin des Dames ===
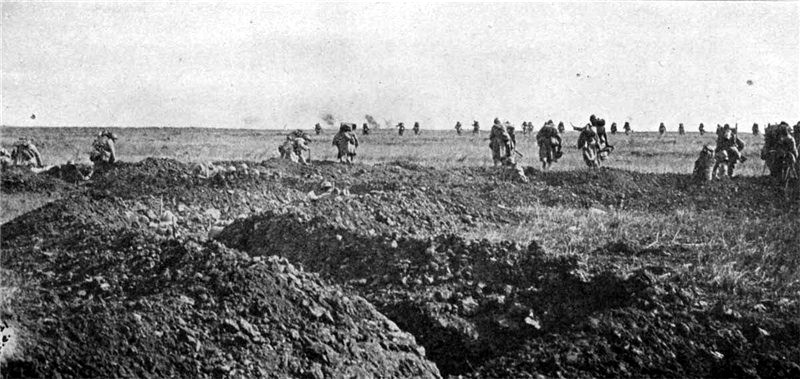
French infantry advance on the Chemin des Dames.

The Fifth Army attacked on 16 April at 6:00 a.m., which dawned misty and overcast. From the beginning German machine-gunners were able to engage the French infantry and inflict many casualties, although German artillery-fire was far less destructive. Courcy on the right flank was captured but the advance was stopped at the Aisne–Marne canal. The canal was crossed further north and Bermericourt was captured against a determined German defence. From Bermericourt to the Aisne the French attack was repulsed and south of the river French infantry were forced back to their start-line. On the north bank of the Aisne the French attack was more successful, the 42nd and 69th divisions reached the German second position between the Aisne and the Miette, the advance north of Berry penetrating 4.0 km (2.5 mi). Russian troops participated in the attack and the 1st Russian Brigade captured the village of Kursi; the Russian commander was wounded and the brigade lost more than half of its troops but captured 635 prisoners and held the village.

The attack on the right flank of the Sixth Army, which faced north between Oulches and Missy, took place from Oulches to Soupir and had less success than the Fifth Army; the II Colonial Corps advanced for 0.80 km (0.5 mi) in the first thirty minutes and was then stopped. The XX Corps attack from Vendresse to the Oise–Aisne Canal had more success, the 153rd Division on the right flank reached the Chemin des Dames south of Courtecon after a second attack, managing an advance of 2.01 km (1.25 mi). The VI Corps advanced on its west of the Oise–Aisne Canal with its right wing but the left wing was held up. On the northern flank which faced east near Laffaux, I Colonial Corps was able to penetrate only a few hundred yards into the defences of the Condé-Riegel (Condé Switch Line). To the east of Vauxaillon at the north end of the Sixth Army, Mont des Singes was captured with the help of British heavy artillery but then lost to a German counter-attack. The Sixth Army operations took c. 3,500 prisoners but no break-through was achieved and at only one point had the German second position been reached.

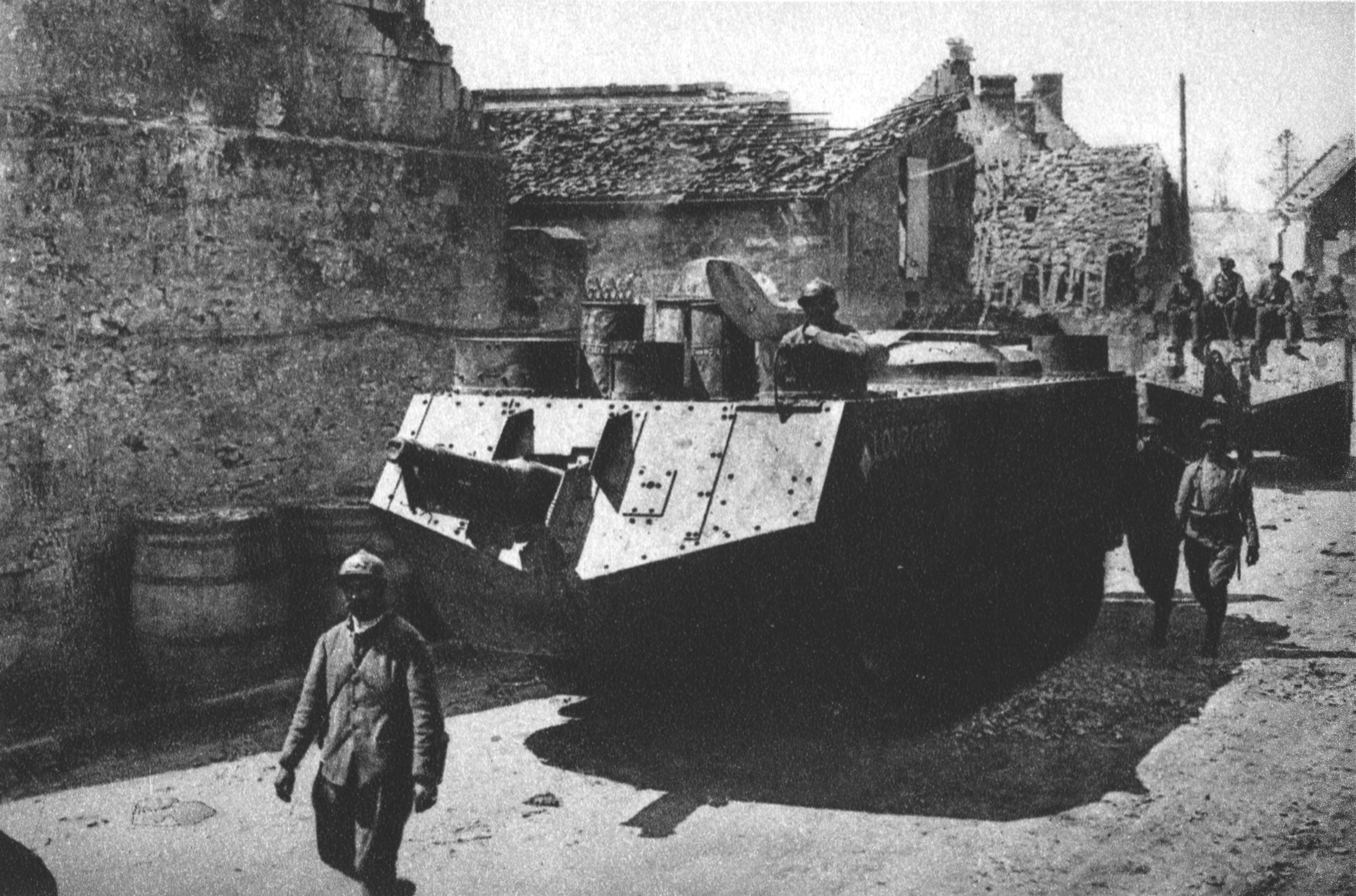
St.Chamond tank

On the second day Nivelle ordered the Fifth Army to attack north-eastwards to reinforce success, believing that the Germans intended to hold the ground in front of the Sixth Army. The Fifth Army was not able substantially to advance on 17 April but the Sixth Army, which had continued to attack overnight, forced a German withdrawal from the area of Braye–Condé–Laffaux to the Siegfriedstellung, which ran from Laffaux mill to the Chemin des Dames and joined the original defences at Courtecon. The German retirement was carried out urgently and many guns were left behind, along with "vast" stocks of munitions. The French infantry reached the new German positions with an advance of 6.4 km (4 mi).

Nivelle ordered the Tenth Army forward between the Fifth and Sixth armies on 21 April and local operations were continued on the fronts of the Fourth and Fifth armies with little success. On 4 to 5 May Brimont was to be captured, which would have been of great tactical value to the French; the attack was postponed on the orders of the French government and was then cancelled. The Tenth Army captured the Californie plateau on the Chemin des Dames and the Sixth Army captured the Siegfriedstellung for 4.0 km (2.5 mi) along the Chemin des Dames and advanced at the salient opposite Laffaux. By the end of 5 May the Sixth Army had reached the outskirts of Allemant and taken c. 4,000 prisoners, by 10 May 28,500 prisoners and 187 guns had been taken by the French armies.

=== Champagne ===
On 17 April the Fourth Army on the left of Groupe d'armées de Centre (GAC) began the subsidiary attack in Champagne from Aubérive to the east of Reims which became known as Bataille des Monts, with the VIII, XVII and XII Corps on an 11 km (6.8 mi) front. The attack began at 4:45 a.m. in cold rain alternating with snow showers. The right flank guard to the east of Suippes was established by the 24th Division and Aubérive on the east bank of the river and the 34th Division took Mont Cornillet and Mont Blond. The Monts were held against a German counter-attack on 19 April by the 5th and 6th (Eingreif divisions,) the 23rd Division and one regiment between Nauroy and Moronvilliers. On the west bank, the Moroccan Division was repulsed on the right and captured Mont sans Nom on the left. To the north-east of the hill the advance reached a depth of 2.4 km (1.5 mi) and next day the advance was pressed beyond Mont Haut and Mont Cornet was captured on 5 May. The Fourth Army attacks took 3,550 prisoners and 27 guns. German attacks on 27 May had temporary success before French counter-attacks recaptured the ground around Mont Haut; lack of troops had forced the Germans into piecemeal attacks instead of a simultaneous attack along all of the front.

== Aftermath ==
=== Analysis ===
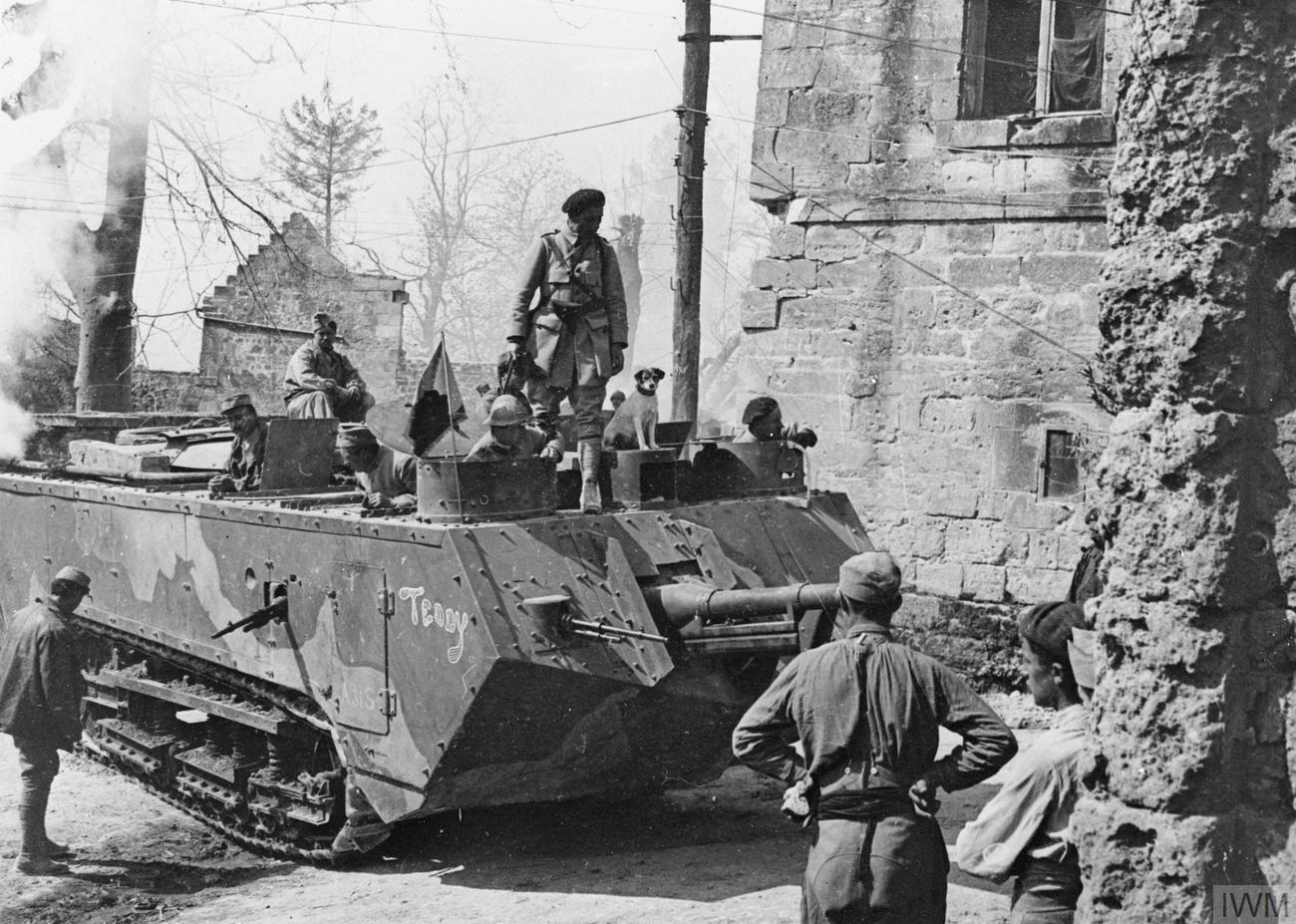
A French Saint-Chamond tank ("Teddy") with a 75 mm field gun, Condé-sur-Aisne, 3 May 1917

In 2015, Andrew Uffindell wrote that retrospective naming and dating of events can affect the way in which the past is understood. The Second Battle of the Aisne began on 16 April but the duration and extent of the battle have been interpreted differently. The ending of the battle is usually given as mid-May but Uffindell called this politically convenient, since it excluded the Battle of La Malmaison, in October, making it easier to blame Nivelle for a disaster. Uffindel wrote that the exclusion of La Malmaison was artificial, since the attack was begun from the ground taken from April to May. General Franchet d'Espèrey called La Malmaison "the decisive phase of the Battle...that began on 16 April and ended on 2 November...".

The offensive advanced the front line by 6–7 km (3.7–4.3 mi) on the front of the Sixth Army, that took 5,300 prisoners and a large amount of equipment. The operation had been planned as a decisive blow to the Germans but by 20 April it was clear that the strategic intent of the offensive had not been achieved and by 25 April most of the fighting had ended. The French tactic of assault brutal et continu suited the German defensive dispositions, since much of the new construction had taken place on reverse slopes. The speed of attack and the depth of the French objectives meant that there was no time to establish artillery observation posts overlooking the Ailette valley, where French infantry had reached the ridge. Tunnels and caves under the ridge nullified much of the destructive power of the French artillery, that was also hampered by poor visibility and by German air superiority making French artillery-observation aircraft even less effective. The rear edge of the German battle zone along the ridge had been reinforced with machine-gun posts; the German divisional commanders chose to fight in the front line and few of the Eingreif divisions were needed in the first few days.

=== Mutiny ===
On 3 May the French 2nd Division refused to follow orders to attack and this mutiny soon spread throughout the army. Towards the end of the offensive, the 2nd Division arrived on the battlefield drunk and without weapons. From 16 to 17 May, there were disturbances in a Chasseur battalion of the 127th Division and a regiment of the 18th Division. Two days later a battalion of the 166th Division staged a demonstration and on 20 May, the 128th Regiment of the 3rd Division and the 66th Regiment of the 18th Division refused orders; individual incidents of insubordination occurred in the 17th Division. Over the next two days spokesmen were elected in two regiments of the 69th Division to petition for an end of the offensive. By 28 May, mutinies had occurred in the 9th Division, 158th Division, 5th Division and the 1st Cavalry Division. By the end of May more units of the 5th, 6th, 13th, 35th, 43rd, 62nd, 77th and 170th divisions mutinied; revolts occurred in 21 divisions in May.

The offensive was suspended on 9 May. The army, politicians and public were stunned by the events and on 16 May, Nivelle was sacked and moved to North Africa. He was replaced by the considerably more cautious Pétain, with Foch as chief of the general staff; the new commanders abandoned the strategy of decisive battle for one of recuperation and defence, to avoid high casualties and to restore morale. A record 27,000 French soldiers deserted in 1917; Pétain had 40–62 mutineers shot as examples and introduced reforms to improve the welfare of French troops, which had a significant effect in restoring morale.

=== Casualties ===
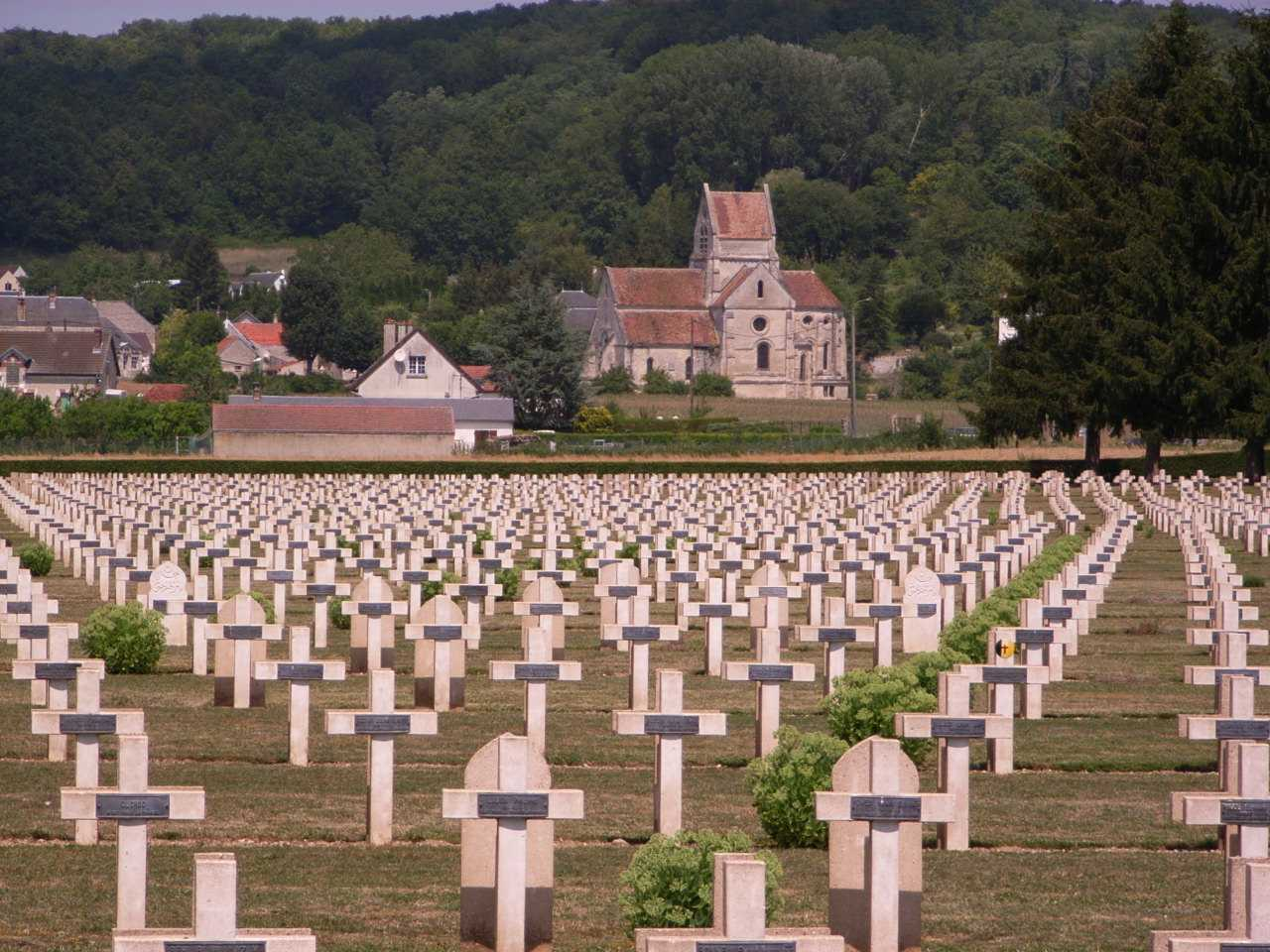
Soupir N° I National Cemetery, near the Chemin des Dames.

Grand Quartier Général (GQG), the French general headquarters had predicted c. 10,000 casualties and French medical services were overwhelmed when the offensive began. In 1919, Pierrefeu gave French casualties from 16 to 25 April as 118,000, of whom 28,000 were killed, 5,000 died of wounds, 80,000 were wounded, 20,000 of whom were fit to return to their units by 30 April and 5,000 were taken prisoner. In 1920, Hayes wrote that British casualties were 160,000 and Russian casualties 5,183 men. In 1939, Wynne wrote that the French suffered 117,000 casualties including 32,000 killed in the first few days but that the effect on military and civilian morale was worse than the casualties.

In 1962, Gerald Nicholson, the Canadian official historian, recorded c. 163,000 German casualties and 187,000 French casualties. Most of the new French Schneider tanks were destroyed by artillery fire. In 2005, Doughty quoted figures of 134,000 French casualties on the Aisne from 16 to 25 April, of whom 30,000 men were killed, 100,000 were wounded and 4,000 were taken prisoner, the casualty rate being the worst since November 1914. From 16 April to 10 May the Fourth, Fifth, Sixth and Tenth armies took 28,500 prisoners and 187 guns. The advance of the Sixth Army was one of the largest made by a French army since trench warfare began.

=== Subsequent operations ===
==== Battle of the Observatories ====
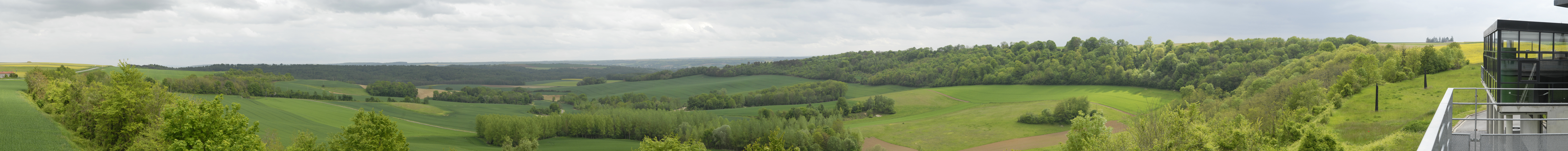
Panorama showing the view from the Dragon's Cave

After the substitution of limited objectives in favour of breakthrough attempts, a French attack on 4 and 5 May by two regiments captured Craonne and took the edge of the Californie plateau but was not able to cross the Ailette River. An attack by the Tenth Army took Vauclair and the I Colonial Corps took the ruins of Laffaux Mill, before operations were suspended again on 8 May. The Germans began a counter-offensive from Vauxaillon at the west end of the Chemin des Dames, to the Californie plateau between Hurtebise and Craonne, beyond the east end of the Chemin des Dames and against the Moronvilliers Heights east of Reims, which lasted throughout June. German attacks on 30 to 31 May prompted a French counter-attack on 18 June and another German attack on 21 June. The main German effort was made in the centre, with five attacks against the Californie plateau from 3 to 6 June, followed by another German attack on 17 June.

On 25 June, a French attack by the 164th Division, supported by flame-throwers, captured the 70 ft (21 m)-deep Dragon's Cave shelter at Hurtebise and adjacent positions, from which they repulsed a German counter-attack at the end of June. The capture of the Dragon's Cave marked the beginning of the Battle of the Observatories proper, which lasted all summer as both sides fought for possession of the high ground on the Chemin des Dames. At Vauxaillon at the west end of the Chemin des Dames, German attacks took place on 20, 22 and 23 June with French counter-attacks on 21 and 24 June. On 4 July, a German attack began on a 11 mi (17 km) front between Craonne and Cerny, followed by French counter-attacks on 7 and 9 July; from 5 May the Germans attacked seventy times in eighty days.

==== Verdun ====
German attacks were conducted against Côte 304 and Mort Homme on 29 and 30 June, beginning a period of attack and counter-attack which continued into July and August. From 20 to 26 August the French conducted the 2ème Bataille Offensive de Verdun (Second Offensive Battle of Verdun). The French captured Bois d'Avocourt, Mort-Homme, Bois Corbeaux and the Bismarck, Kronprinz and Gallwitz tunnels, which had connected the German front lines to the rear at Mort-Homme and Côte 304. On the right bank, Bois Talou, Champneuville, Côte 344, part of Bois Fosse, Bois Chaume and Mormont Farm were captured. Next day Côte 304, Samogneux and Régnieville fell and on 26 August the French reached the southern outskirts of Beaumont. By 26 August the French had captured 9,500 prisoners, thirty guns, 100 trench mortars and 242 machine-guns. By 9 September, the French had taken more than 10,000 prisoners; fighting continued with German counter-attacks on 21, 22, 27 and 28 August, 24 September and 1 October. Ludendorff wrote that the French army had "quickly overcome its depression".

==== Battle of La Malmaison ====
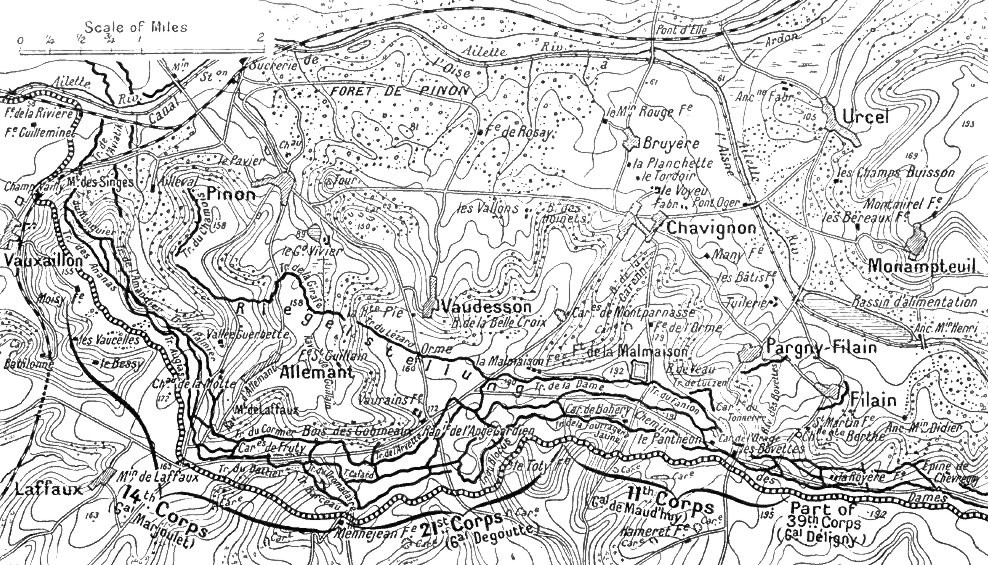
Malmaison and the Laffaux Salient, 1917

The Battle of La Malmaison (Bataille de la Malmaison 23–27 October 1917) led to the French capture of the village and fort of La Malmaison and control of the Chemin des Dames ridge. Boehn chose to defend the front positions, rather than treat them as an advanced zone and conduct the main defence north of the Canal de l'Oise à l'Aisne. Gas bombardments on low-lying land near the canal dispersed very slowly and became so dense that the carriage of ammunition and supplies to the front was made impossible. Eingreif divisions were distributed in battalions along the front line and caught in the French bombardments, where the infantry shelters had been identified by French air reconnaissance and systematically destroyed.

Zero hour had been set for 5:45 a.m. but the French intercepted a German message ordering the front garrisons to be ready at 5:30 a.m. and changed zero hour to 5:15 a.m. It began to rain at 6:00 a.m. and a force of 63 Schneider CA1 and Saint-Chamond tanks many bogged down in mud. The French infantry and 21 tanks reached the German second position according to plan; the 38th Division captured Fort de Malmaison and XXI Corps took Allemant and Vaudesson. On 25 October the village and forest of Pinon were captured and the line of the Canal de l'Oise à l'Aisne was reached. In four days the French advanced 9.7 km (6 mi) and forced the Germans off the Chemin des Dames, back to the north bank of the Ailette valley by the night of 1/2 November. The French took 11,157 prisoners, 200 guns and 220 heavy mortars for c. 10,000 casualties from 23 to 26 October.

==== Messines ====
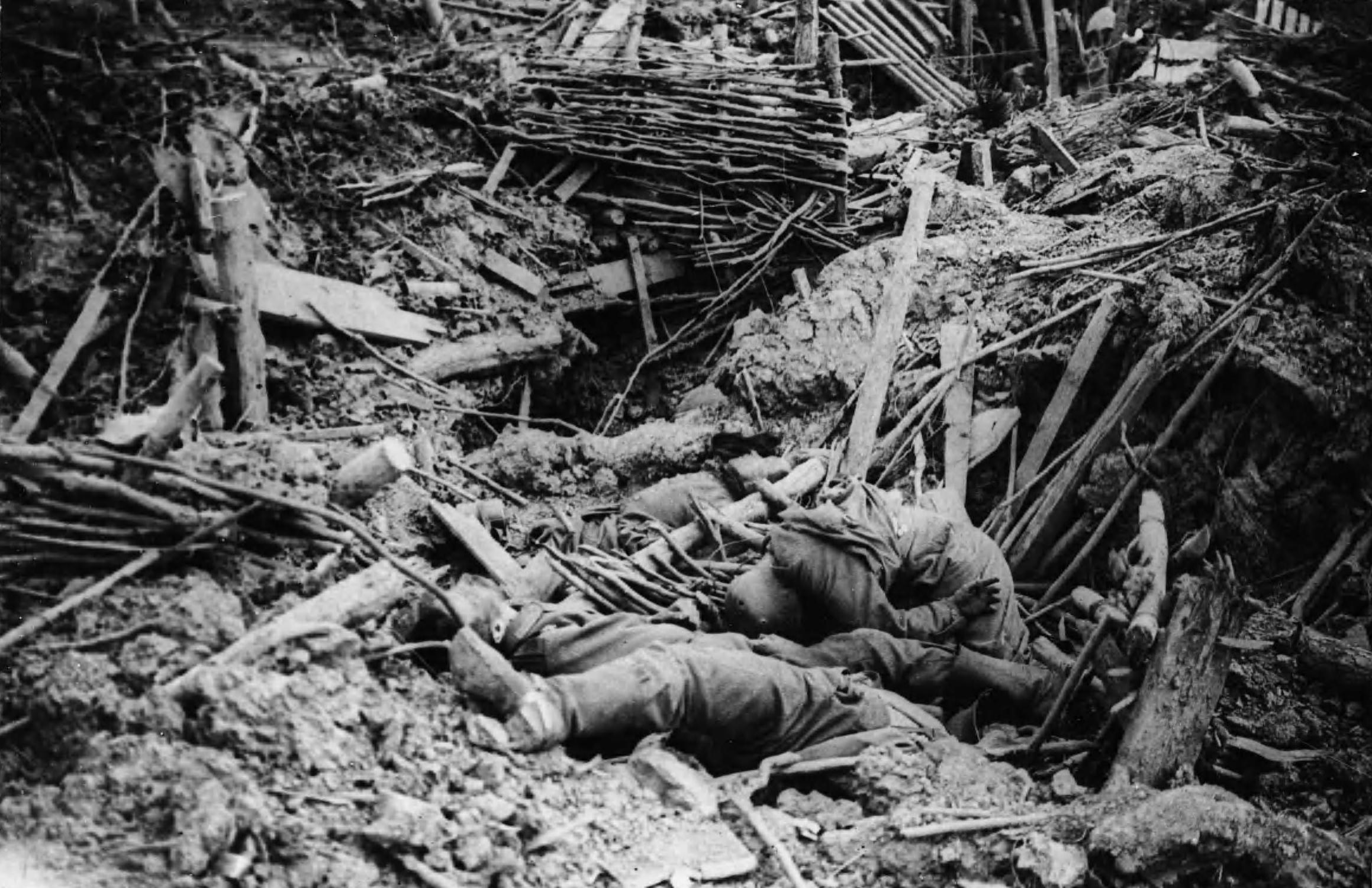
German trench destroyed by a mine explosion

Since mid-1915, the British had been covertly digging mines under the German positions on the ridge. Nineteen mines were fired on 7 June at 3:10 a.m. British Summer Time. The final objectives were largely gained before dark and British losses in the morning were light, although the planners had expected casualties of up to 50 per cent in the initial attack. When the infantry advanced over the far edge of the ridge, German artillery and machine-guns on the valley floor had direct observation and the British artillery was less able to provide covering fire. Fighting continued on the lower slopes on the east side of the ridge until 14 June. The attack prepared the way for the main attack later in the summer, by removing the Germans from the dominating ground on the southern face of the Ypres salient, which they had held for two years.

==== Third Battle of Ypres ====
The British conducted a series of attacks in Flanders, beginning with the Battle of Pilckem Ridge (31 July – 2 August), followed by the Battle of Langemarck (16–18 August), The Battle of the Menin Road Ridge (20–25 September), The Battle of Polygon Wood (26 September – 3 October), The Battle of Broodseinde (4 October) The Battle of Poelcappelle (9 October) The First Battle of Passchendaele (12 October) and The Second Battle of Passchendaele (26 October – 10 November) for control of the ridges south and east of the Belgian city of Ypres (Ieper) in West Flanders. The next stage of the Allied strategy was an advance to Torhout–Couckelaere, to close the German-controlled railway running through Roulers and Thourout. Further operations and a British supporting attack along the Belgian coast from Nieuwpoort, combined with an Operation Hush, an amphibious landing, were then to reach the Dutch frontier via Bruges. The resistance of the German 4th Army, unusually wet weather, the onset of winter and the diversion of British and French resources to Italy, following the Austro-German victory at the Battle of Caporetto (24 October – 19 November) allowed the Germans to avoid a general withdrawal, which had seemed inevitable to them early in October. The campaign ended in November when the Canadian Corps captured Passchendaele. The German submarine bases on the coast remained but the objective of diverting the Germans from the French further south, while they recovered from the failure of the Nivelle Offensive, succeeded.

== See also ==
- Russian Expeditionary Force in France
