= Pingeot =

Pingeot (English: /pæ̃ˈʒoʊ/, French: [an pɛ̃ʒo]) is a French surname. Notable people with the surname include:

- Anne Pingeot (born 1943), French art historian, mistress of François Mitterrand
- Mazarine Pingeot (born 1974), French writer, journalist, and professor, daughter of François Mitterrand
