= Émile Fayolle =

French general

Marshal Émile Fayolle
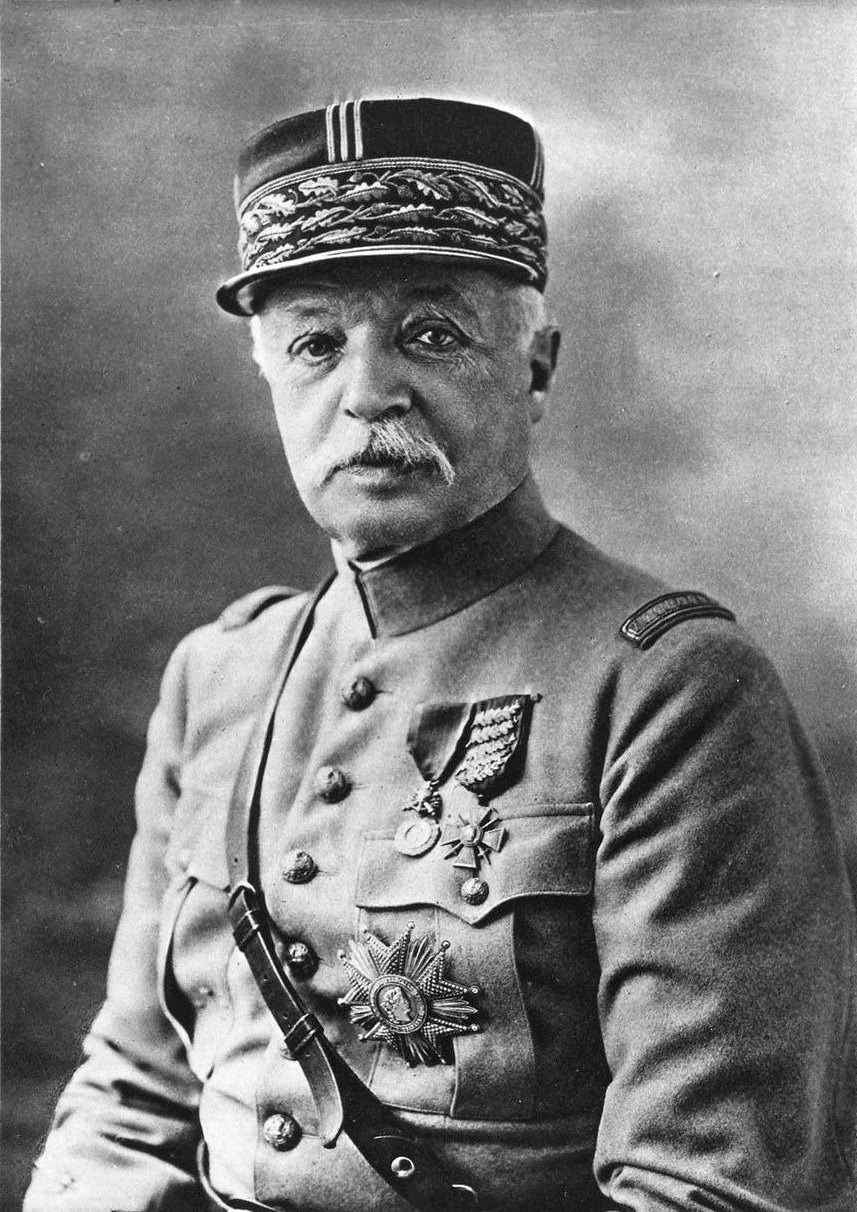

Member of the Superior War Council

Personal details
- Born: 14 May 1852 Le Puy-en-Velay, Haute-Loire, French Empire
- Died: 27 August 1928 (aged 76) Paris, French Republic
- Education: École polytechnique

Military service
- Allegiance: (France) Third Republic
- Branch/service: French Army: Artillery
- Years of service: 1873 – 1919
- Rank: Division general (Note: Marshal of France is a dignity and not a rank.)
- Commands: 4th Army; 6th Army; 1st Army; Army Group Reserve
- Battles/wars: World War I

Marie Émile Fayolle (French: [emil fajɔl]; 14 May 1852 – 27 August 1928) was a French general during World War I and a diplomat, elevated to the dignity of Marshal of France.

== Early life ==
Marie Émile Fayolle was born on 14 May 1852, in Puy-en-Velay, at 9 rue du Chenebouterie, a road renamed in 1961 "rue du Maréchal-Fayolle". He is the first of six children born from the marriage of Jean Pierre Auguste Fayolle, lacemaker in Le Puy, and his wife Marie Rosine Badiou.

He married in 1883 to Marie Louise Augustine Collangettes, in Clermont-Ferrand, and had two children. He is the grandfather of the pilot Émile Fayolle and the great-grandfather of Anne Pingeot, mother of Mazarine Pingeot.

Fayolle studied at the École polytechnique from 1873, where he graduated with the class of 1875 and was commissioned into the artillery.

== Military career ==
During his career he served in the artillery. He participated in the Pacification of Tunisia in 1881. Promoted to Captain he entered the École de Guerre in 1889 and graduated with distinction in 1891. From 1897 to 1908 he taught artillery at the École supérieure de Guerre. Fayolle was promoted to Brigadier General on 31 December 1910, taking command of the artillery of the 12th Army Corps. Two years later he took command of the 19th Artillery Brigade. He retired on 14 May 1914.

With the outbreak of the First World War, Fayolle was recalled from retirement by the French Commander-in-Chief Joseph Joffre and given command of the 70th Infantry Division. Fayolle took part in the fighting near Nancy, notably the Battle of Grand Couronné, which helped make possible the French victory at the First Battle of the Marne. Later, Philippe Pétain took command of the Corps in which Fayolle was serving, and the two commanders became close.

In May 1915, Fayolle succeeded Pétain in command of the 33rd Corps. In this command he participated in the Artois Offensive.

In 1916, Fayolle was given command of the Sixth Army, which he commanded at the Battle of the Somme, under the command of Ferdinand Foch's Northern Army Group. In preparation for the Somme offensive, the French Sixth Army under Fayolle would attack with 8 divisions, a force reduced from the original 40 divisions because of the French needs at Verdun. During the offensive, Fayolle is credited with successfully using a combination of artillery resources and infantry tactics to push the less well-defended Germans back across an 8-mile (12.87 km) long segment of his front. In August, as the Battle of the Somme continued, General Foch, commander of French forces on the Somme, visited British General Haig at Val Vion. Foch appointed Fayolle, one of the most successful army commanders of July, to fight alongside the British forces between their right flank and the north bank of the River Somme. During the British and French Somme offensive from 1 August to 12 September, Fayolle decided without consulting the high command that his troops were too exhausted to launch a major offensive. He then reduced his command's participation in the battle to 1 division. The British had lost significant French support on their right during the offensive. In October, French forces led by Fayolle advanced almost to Sailly Saillisol by successfully using the artillery-barrage system.

On 31 December 1916, Fayolle was transferred to command the First Army. When Philippe Pétain was appointed Chief of the General Staff in April 1917, Fayolle was put in command of the Army Group Center, to the disappointment of Foch, who had hoped for the command himself; Pétain replaced Nivelle as Commander-in-Chief in May 1917.

On 16 November 1917, after the Italians met disaster at Caporetto, Fayolle was transferred to Italy with six divisions and made Commander-in-Chief of the French troops supporting the Italians.

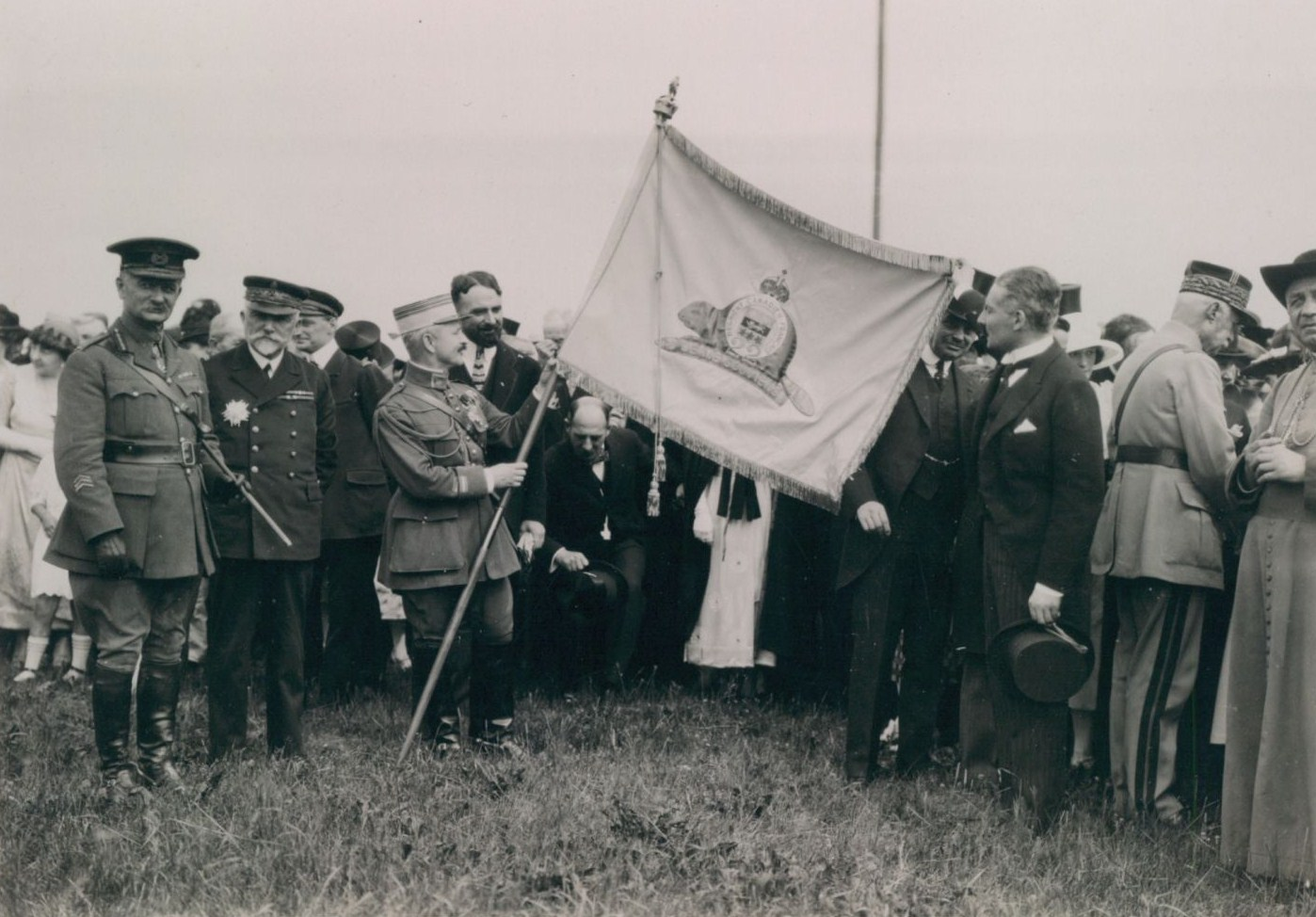
Marshal Fayolle awards the flag of the Canadian Royal 22nd Regiment on the Plains of Abraham in Quebec City, Canada. Fayolle had been sent to Canada on a gratitude mission for Canada's assistance during the First World War.

Fayolle stayed in Italy until March 1918, when he was recalled to France and put at the head of the 55 division-strong Army Group Reserve, with which he played a role in stopping the last significant German offensives. After the allied victory in the Second Battle of the Marne, he took part in the allied counteroffensive until the end of the war. From July until November Fayolle's command reduced the Marne Salient and drove towards the Rhine. He commanded occupation forces in the Palatinat and Rheinhessen, occupying Mainz and the left bank of the Rhine with Charles Mangin, from 14 December 1918. He was also a member of the Allied Control Commission.

== Marshal of France ==
Fayolle was named in 1920 a member of the French Conseil Supérieur de la Guerre, the highest French military council, and served as inspector general of aeronautics from 1921 to 1924. The title of Marshal of France was awarded to him on 19 February 1921.

He was charged with leading a mission of gratitude to Canada for the country's aid during the war and presented the Canadian government with a bronze bust called La France, made by the sculptor Auguste Rodin. Fayolle also undertook diplomatic missions to Italy.

== Quote ==
"For every position there must be a battle, following each other as rapidly as possible. Each one needs a new plan, a new artillery preparation. If one goes too quickly, one risks being checked; too slowly and the enemy has time to make more positions. That is the problem, and it is serious." (21 January 1916)

== Legacy ==
He also has a statue in front of the Les Invalides. Émile Fayolle died in Paris on 27 August 1928, at 18 avenue de La Bourdonnais. His body rests in the governors' vault at Les Invalides.

During the War, Émile Fayolle had kept a diary, published by Plon in 1964 under the title Cahiers secrets de la Grande Guerre and republished digitally in December 2013; it provides deep insight into French strategic thinking at the time.

== Honours and decorations ==
- Légion d'honneur
  - Knight - 30 December 1890
  - Officer - 30 December 1911
  - Commander - 11 October 1914
  - Grand Officer - 3 October 1916
  - Grand Cross - 10 July 1918
- Médaille militaire - 21 October 1919
- Croix de guerre 1914–1918 with 5 palms
- Distinguished Service Medal (US)
