= Army Group Reserve (France) =

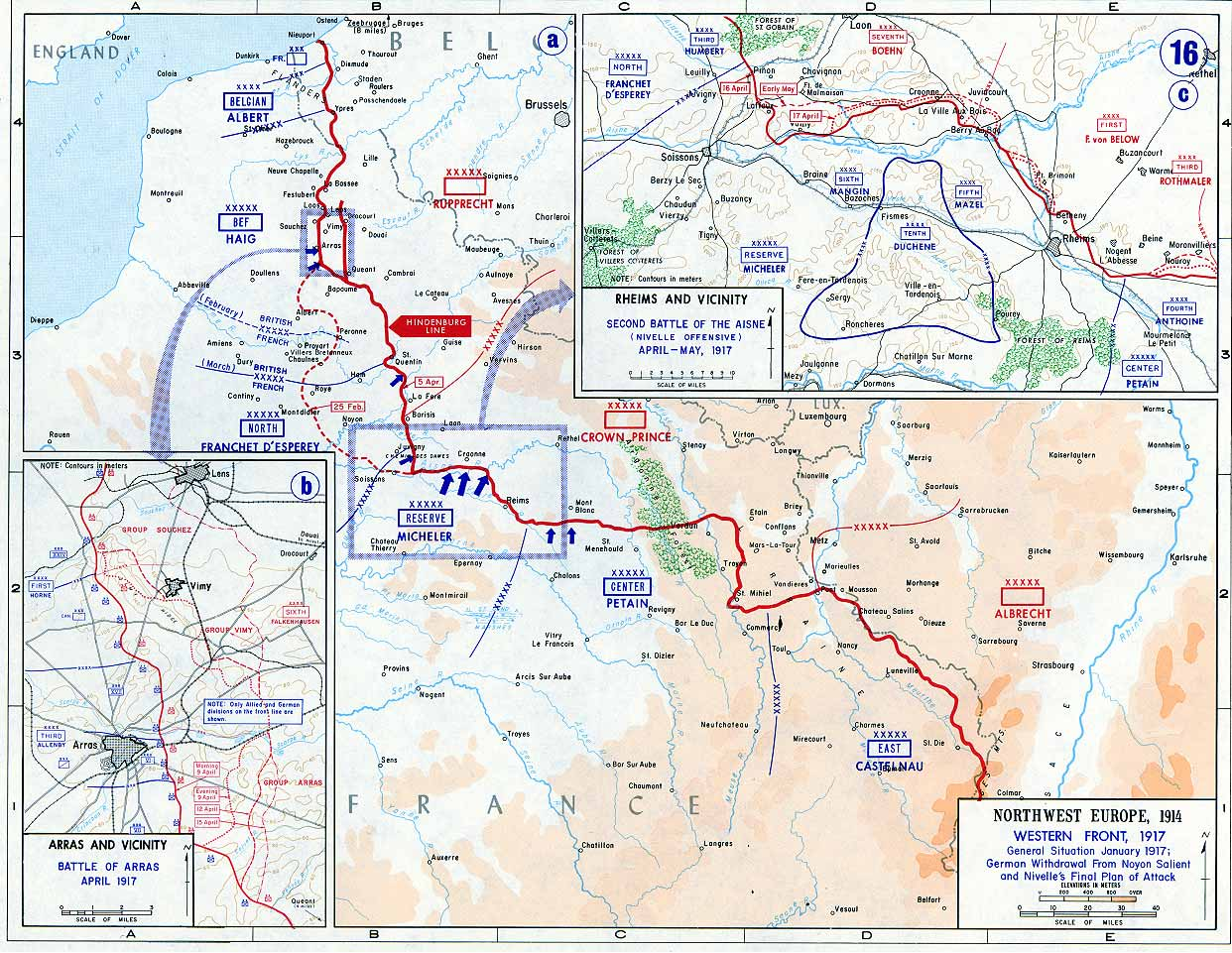
situation of the Army Group Reserve in 1917

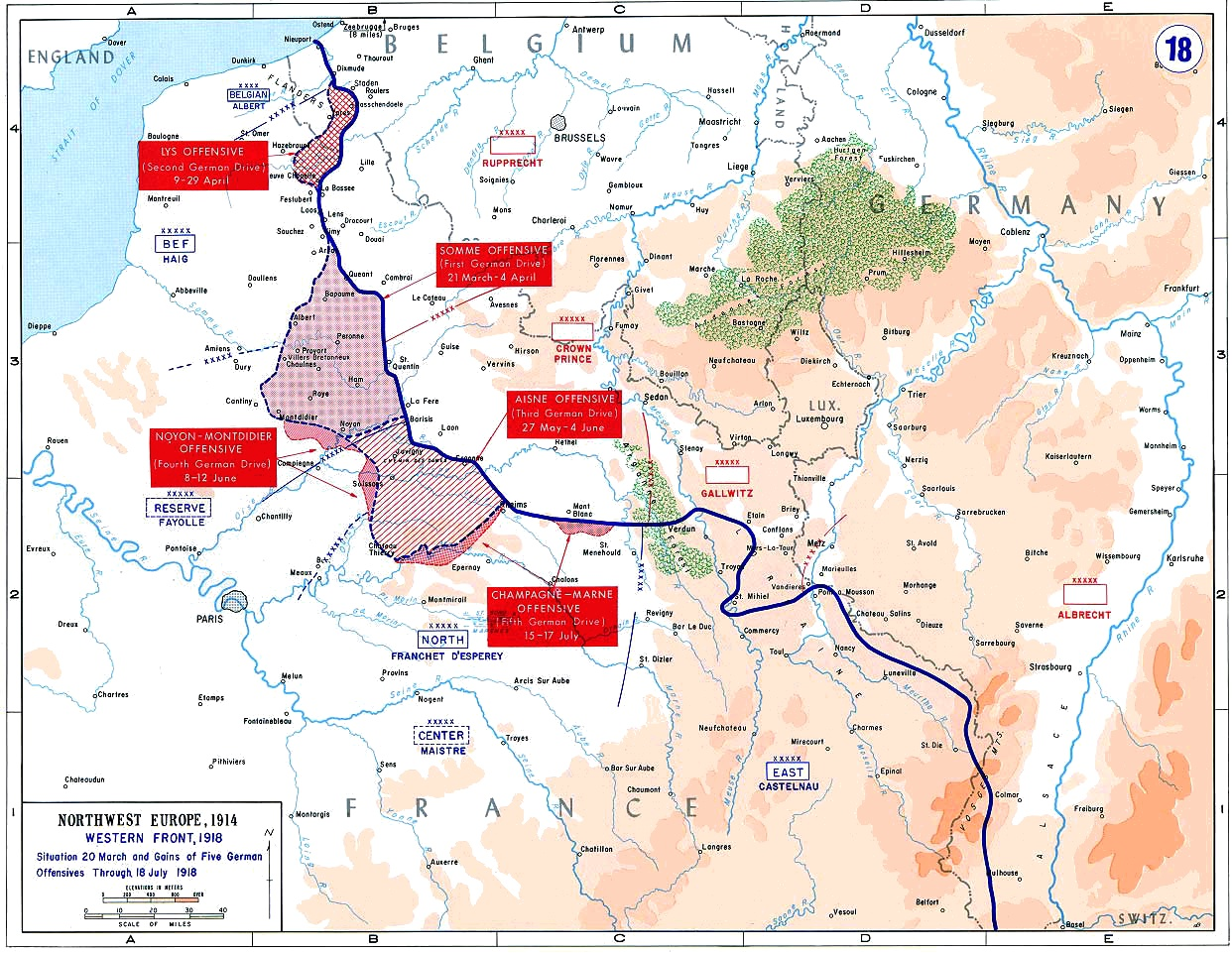
situation of the Army Group Reserve in Spring 1918

Army Group Reserve (French: Groupe d'armées de réserve) or Army Group Rupture (French: Groupe d'armées de rupture), G. A. R.) was a grouping of French field armies during World War I, which was created on January 1, 1917 to fight in the Offensive of Chemin des Dames. The Army group was dissolved on May 8, 1917 after the failure of the Offensive. The Army Group was recreated after the German spring offensive of 1918.

== Composition ==
=== April 15, 1917 ===
- 6th Army (général Charles Mangin)
- 10th Army (général Denis Auguste Duchêne)
- 5th Army (général Olivier Mazel)

=== March 23, 1918 ===
- 1st Army (général Marie-Eugène Debeney)
- 3rd Army (général Georges Louis Humbert)

=== July 1, 1918 ===
- 6th Army (général Jean Degoutte)
- 10th Army (général Charles Mangin)

== Commanders ==
- Général Joseph Alfred Micheler (January 1, 1917 – May 8, 1917)
- Général Émile Fayolle (February 23, 1918 – December 1918)

== Sources ==
- The French Army and the First World War by Elizabeth Greenhalgh
- 14-18 : Espoirs et drames sur le Chemin des Dames
