= La Malmaison =

- Commune
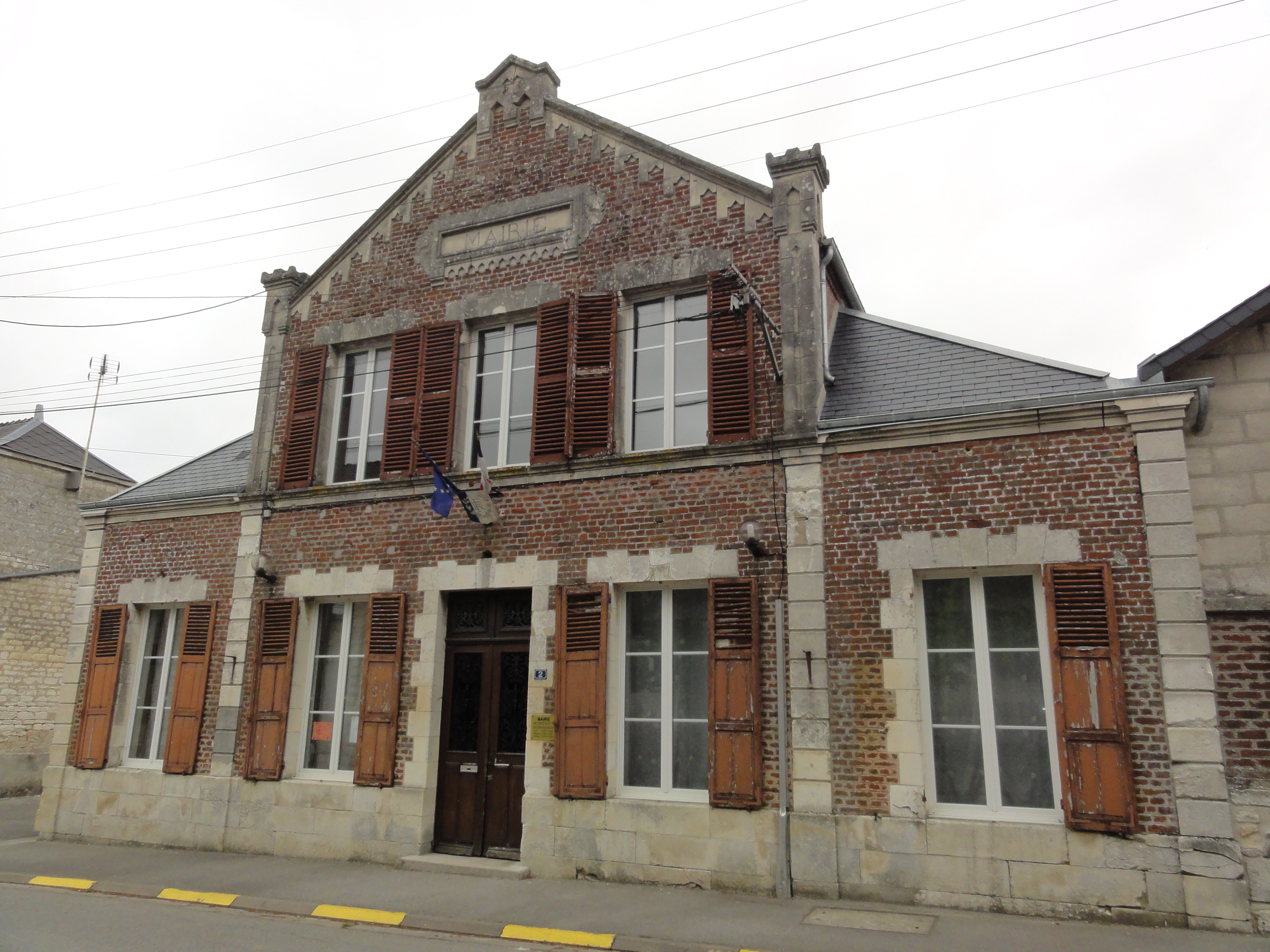
- The town hall of La Malmaison
- Location of La Malmaison
- Location within France Location within Hauts-de-France
- Coordinates: 49°30′59″N 3°58′54″E
- Country: France
- Region: Hauts-de-France
- Department: Aisne
- Arrondissement: Laon
- Canton: Villeneuve-sur-Aisne

Government
  - Mayor (2026–32): Ingrid Carpentier
- Area^{1}: 25.61 km^{2} (9.89 sq mi)
- Elevation: 110 m (360 ft)
- Highest elevation: 133 m (436 ft)
- Lowest elevation: 78 m (256 ft)
- Population (2023): 403
  - Density: 15.7/km^{2} (40.8/sq mi)
- Time zone: UTC+01:00 (CET)
  - Summer (DST): UTC+02:00 (CEST)
- INSEE/Postal code: 02454 /02190
- ^{1} French Land Register data, which excludes lakes, ponds, glaciers > 1 km^{2} (0.386 sq mi or 247 acres) and river estuaries.

La Malmaison (French pronunciation: [la malmɛzɔ̃]) is a commune in the Aisne department in Hauts-de-France in northern France.

== Population ==
Historical population
Year	Pop.	±% p.a.
1968	389	—
1975	356	−1.26%
1982	302	−2.32%
1990	337	+1.38%
1999	363	+0.83%
2007	407	+1.44%
2012	415	+0.39%
2017	410	−0.24%
2023	403	−0.29%
Source: INSEE

== See also ==
- Communes of the Aisne department
- Battle of La Malmaison
