= Mazarine Pingeot =

French writer, journalist and professor

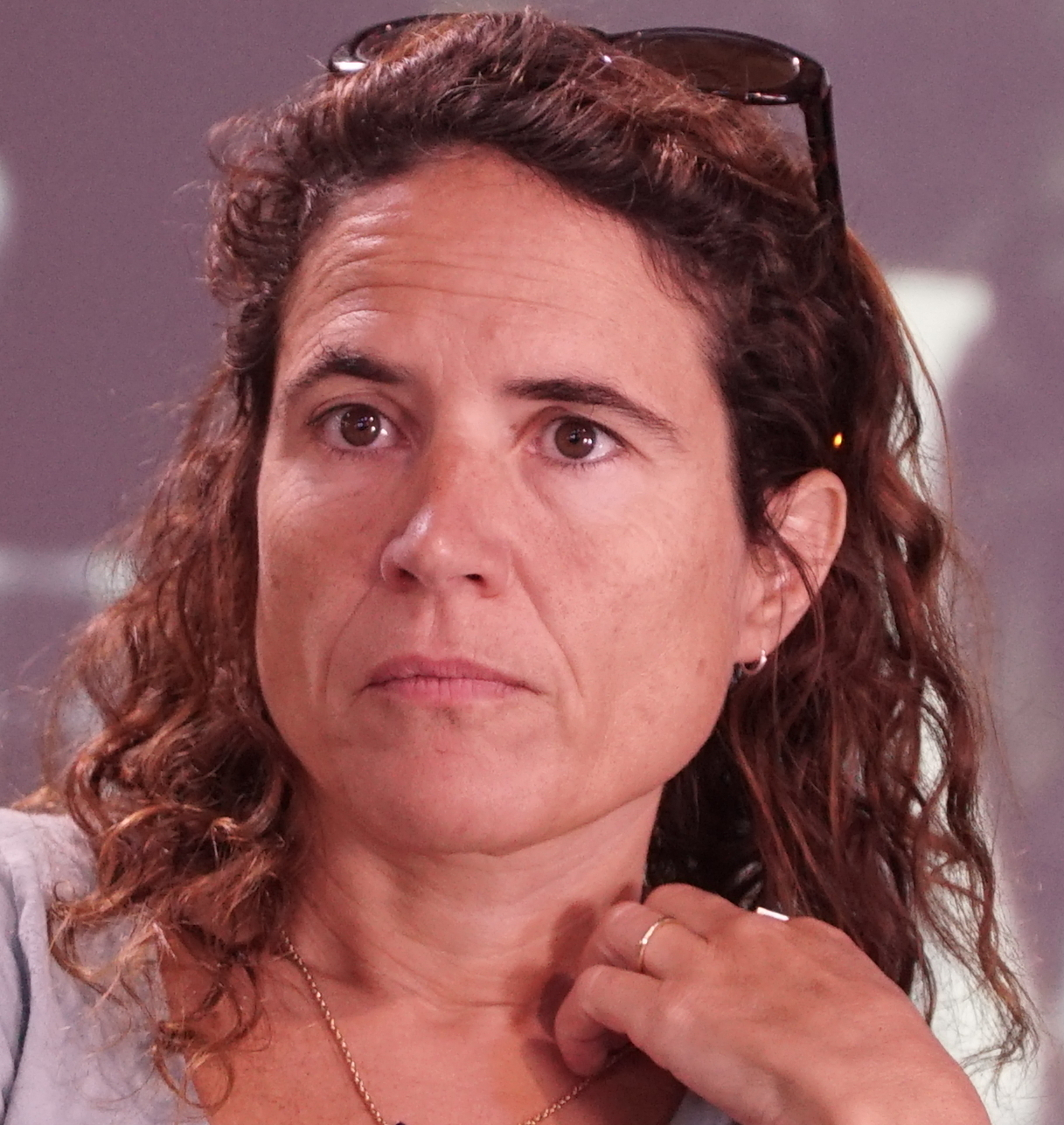
- Pingeot in 2019
- Born: Mazarine Marie Pingeot; 18 December 1974 (age 51); Avignon, Vaucluse, France
- Occupations: Journalist; writer; academic
- Spouse: Didier Le Bret (m. 2017)
- Children: 3
- Parents: François Mitterrand (father); Anne Pingeot (mother)
- Relatives: Jean-Christophe Mitterrand (half-brother); Frédéric Mitterrand (cousin)

Mazarine Marie Mitterrand Pingeot (French pronunciation: [mazaʁin maʁi mit(ɛ)ʁɑ̃ pɛ̃ʒo]; born Mazarine Marie Pingeot on 18 December 1974) is a French writer, journalist and professor.

== Biography ==
Pingeot is the daughter of former French president François Mitterrand and his mistress Anne Pingeot. She is said to be named after the Bibliothèque Mazarine, the oldest library in France, because of her parents' love for books. She could also be named after cardinal Mazarin, who was admired by her father. Her existence was long hidden from the press but was once almost revealed by the French writer Jean-Edern Hallier. Keeping Mazarine Pingeot's identity from the public was one of the motivations behind some of the illegal wiretapping that Mitterrand ordered under the guise of fighting terrorism. Pingeot legally adopted her father's surname in November 2016.

She was a student first at the elite Lycée Henri-IV in Paris and then at the École Normale Supérieure de Fontenay-Saint-Cloud (now named the École Normale Supérieure de Lyon), a highly prestigious school. In 1997, she passed the agrégation de philosophie, and then briefly started - but did not complete - a Ph.D. thesis on the philosopher Spinoza, working as a teaching assistant at the Université de Provence Aix-Marseille I.

She was also a journalist (writing for Elle between 1999 and 2001) and a television anchor (on a French cable television channel, Paris Première).

== Works ==
In 1998, she published her first novel, titled Premier Roman ("First Novel"), which was not highly praised by critics but was translated into many languages, including English. In 2000, she published Zeyn or the Reconquest, for which Charles Bremner of The Times wrote "If there was a prize for braving the ridicule of critics, it would go to Mazarine Pingeot" (8 May 2000). In 2003, she published a series of literary comments, "They told me who I was" ("they" being the books). In February 2005, she published her fourth book, Not a Word, a diary about her childhood life as a national secret. In 2007, she published her fifth book, Le Cimetière des poupées (The Cemetery of the Dolls), a novel about a woman who kills her baby and puts it in a freezer.

In 2019, Mitterrand Pingeot published a novel titled Se taire ("Keeping quiet") about a female photographer raped by a prominent politician. Commentators have drawn parallels with the accusations by her niece Pascale Mitterrand against the French politician Nicolas Hulot, which accusations had been dismissed by the French authorities. Mitterrand Pingeot's 2020 novel Et la peur continue ("And the fear is constant") follows a woman who lives in a constant state of fear caused by the everyday pressures she experiences in her professional and personal life.

== Family ==
She has one son, Astor, born in 2005, and two daughters, born in 2007 and 2009, with her former partner Mohamed Ulad-Mohand, a film director. In 2017 she married diplomat Didier Le Bret.
