= Anne Pingeot =

French art historian

Anne Pingeot (French: [an pɛ̃ʒo]; born 13 May 1943) is a French art historian specialising in French sculpture of the 19th century and author of several books and catalogues. She was curator at the department of sculpture at the Louvre and the Musée d'Orsay.

She was the mistress of François Mitterrand, the former President of the French Republic. Together they had a daughter, Mazarine Pingeot.
