= Olivier Mazel =

French general (1858-1940)

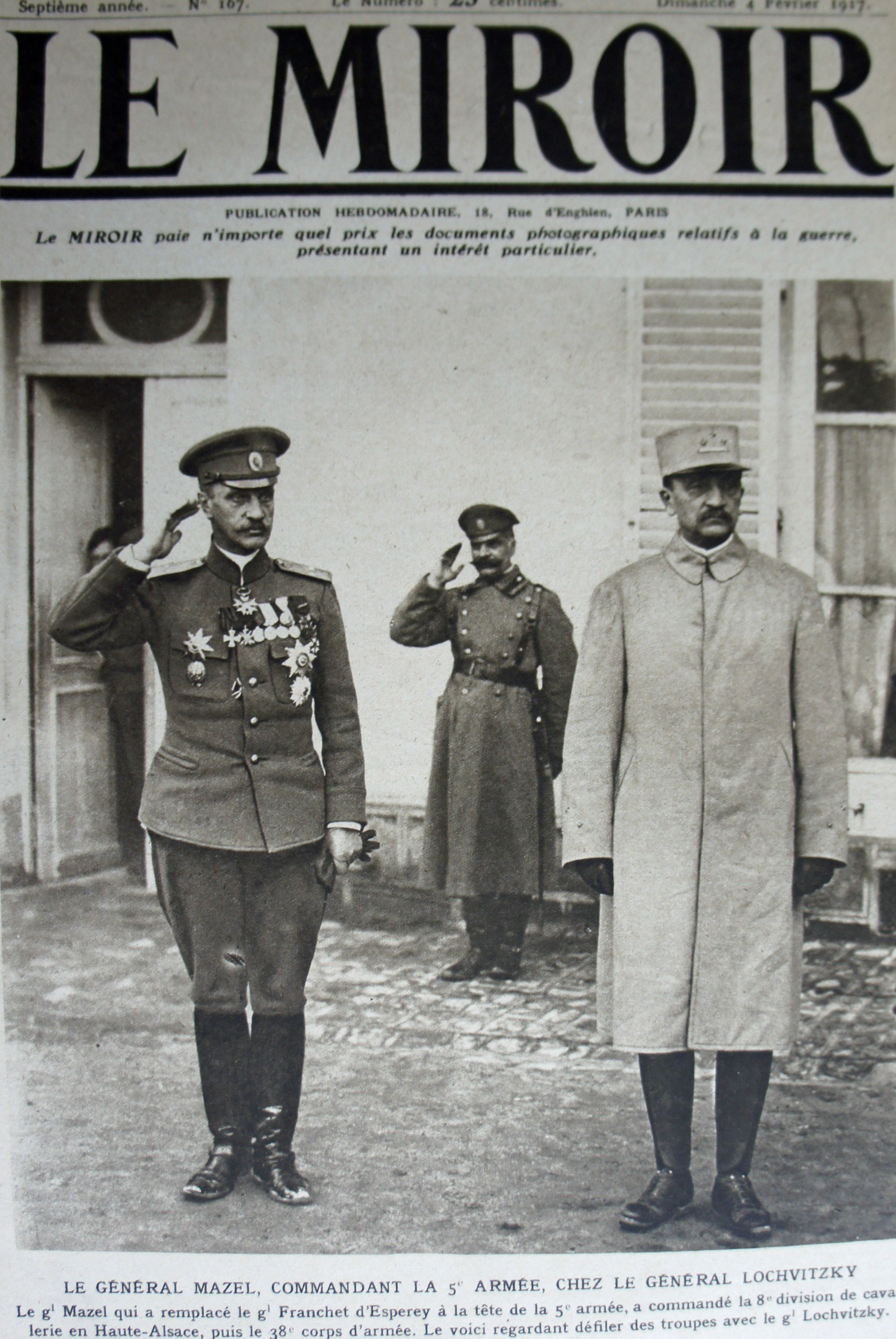
Olivier Mazel (right) with Russian Lieutenant General Nikolai Aleksandrovich Lokhvitsky in February 1917.

Olivier Charles Armand Adrien Mazel (16 September 1858 – 10 March 1940) was a French Army general during World War I. He commanded the First (25 March 1916 – 31 March 1916) and Fifth Armies (31 March 1916 - 22 May 1917) during the war. One of General Robert Nivelle's appointments he was removed from command of the Fifth Army by General Émile Fayolle.

== Decorations ==
- Légion d'honneur
  - Knight (11 July 1898)
  - Officer (12 July 1911)
  - Commander (13 July 1915)
- Médaille Interalliée de la Victoire
- Médaille Commémorative de la Grande Guerre
- Médaille Coloniale with "Tunisie" bar
- Distinguished Service Medal (US)
- Companion of the Order of the Bath (UK)
