= Joseph Alfred Micheler =

French general (1861–1931)

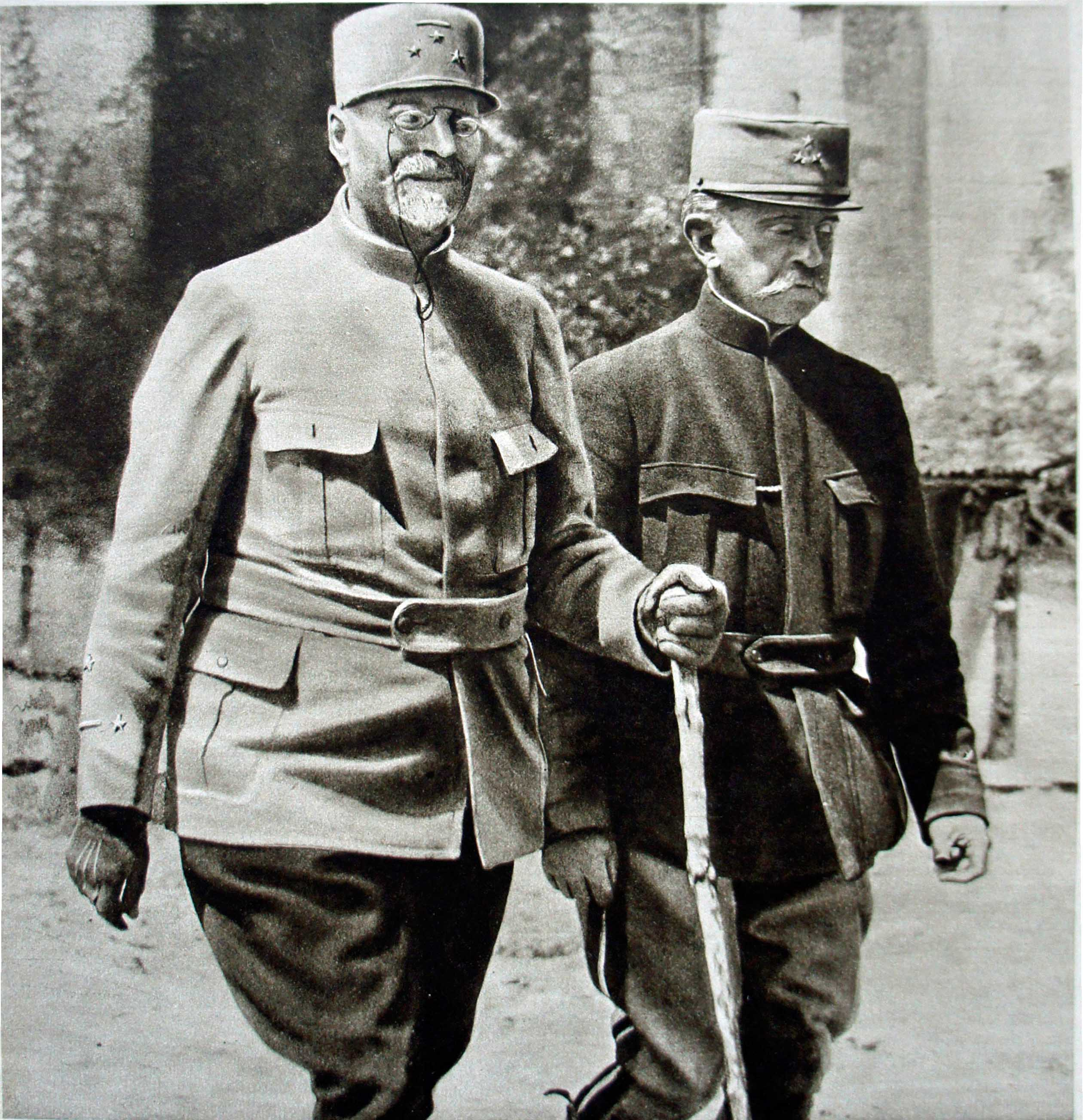
- Generals Micheler and Marchand left to right
- Born: 23 September 1861; Phalsbourg, Second French Empire
- Died: 17 March 1931 (aged 69) Nice, Third French Republic
- Allegiance: Armée française
- Branch: Infantry
- Service years: 1880–1919
- Rank: Général de division
- Commands: 53rd Infantry Division; 38th Army Corps; Tenth Army; Army Group Reserve; First Army; Fifth Army
- Conflicts: World War I
- Awards: Légion d'honneur Croix de Guerre

Joseph Alfred Micheler (23 September 1861 Phalsbourg, France – 17 March 1931 Nice, France) was a French general in the First World War.

== Life ==
Born in Phalsbourg, Moselle from a Lorrainian family which preferred to be French than German when the city was annexed by the Kaiser in 1871. He entered St. Cyr in October 1880, and was appointed a sub-lieutenant on the completion of his course in 1882. He was promoted lieutenant in 1886, captain in 1891, major in 1901 and lieutenant-colonel in 1909. Three years later he was made a colonel.

At the outbreak of World War I he served as chief-of-staff to VI Corps. In October 1914, he was promoted brigadier, and in January 1915 was transferred as chief-of-staff to the First Army.

On 3 August 1915, he took over command of the 53rd Infantry Division, being later (25 March 1916) promoted a temporary General of Division and appointed to command XXXVIII Army Corps.

Ten days later he was placed in command of Tenth Army. On 22 June 1916, he was confirmed in his rank as General of Division. He commanded Tenth Army during the Battle of the Somme, and was then promoted to command a new Army Group (known as G.A.R. – Army Group "Reserve" or "Rupture") formed behind the centre for the exploitation of the victory counted upon in General Nivelle's Aisne scheme. He was thus involved very deeply in the controversies which centred upon that scheme both before and after that offensive. It was principally his criticisms that initiated the internal crisis, and led to the council of war, in which, however, he seems not to have followed up his objections. He also enjoyed strained relations with his subordinate Mangin as well as with Nivelle; Mangin sought afterwards to saddle him with part of the responsibility for the relative failure of the offensive.

After his Army Group had been broken up he was demoted back to command of an Army. He briefly commanded First Army, then Fifth Army for a year, until June 1918, before being removed after the near debacle of the Third Battle of the Aisne. He was made a commander of the Legion of Honour on 30 September 1916.

He was buried at Saint Roch Cemetery.
