= Georges de Bazelaire =

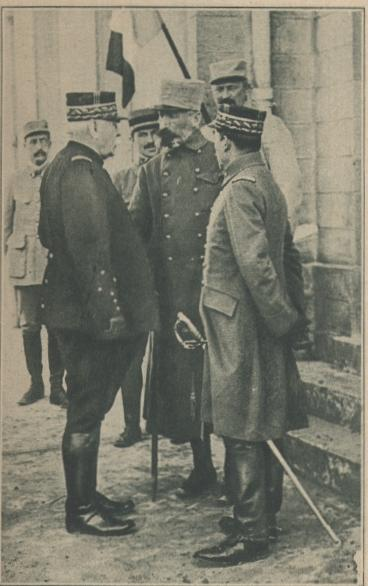
Bazelaire (in center) speaks with General Joseph Joffre (on left)

Georges de Bazelaire (January 30, 1858 – March 29, 1954) was a Major General in the French Army. During World War I, Bazelaire commanded the 135th Infantry Regiment, the 27th and 38th Infantry Divisions and the 7th Army Corps.

== World War I ==
In 1916, general de Bazelaire took part in the Battle of Verdun, defending the left bank of the river Meuse: « He was to command the half of the Région Fortifiée de Verdun west of the river Meuse, including the section of front between Avocourt and the Meuse ». In the first days of March, intense fighting involved the troops under Bazelaire's command in the areas of Bois des Corbeaux, Mort-Homme and the Cote 304.

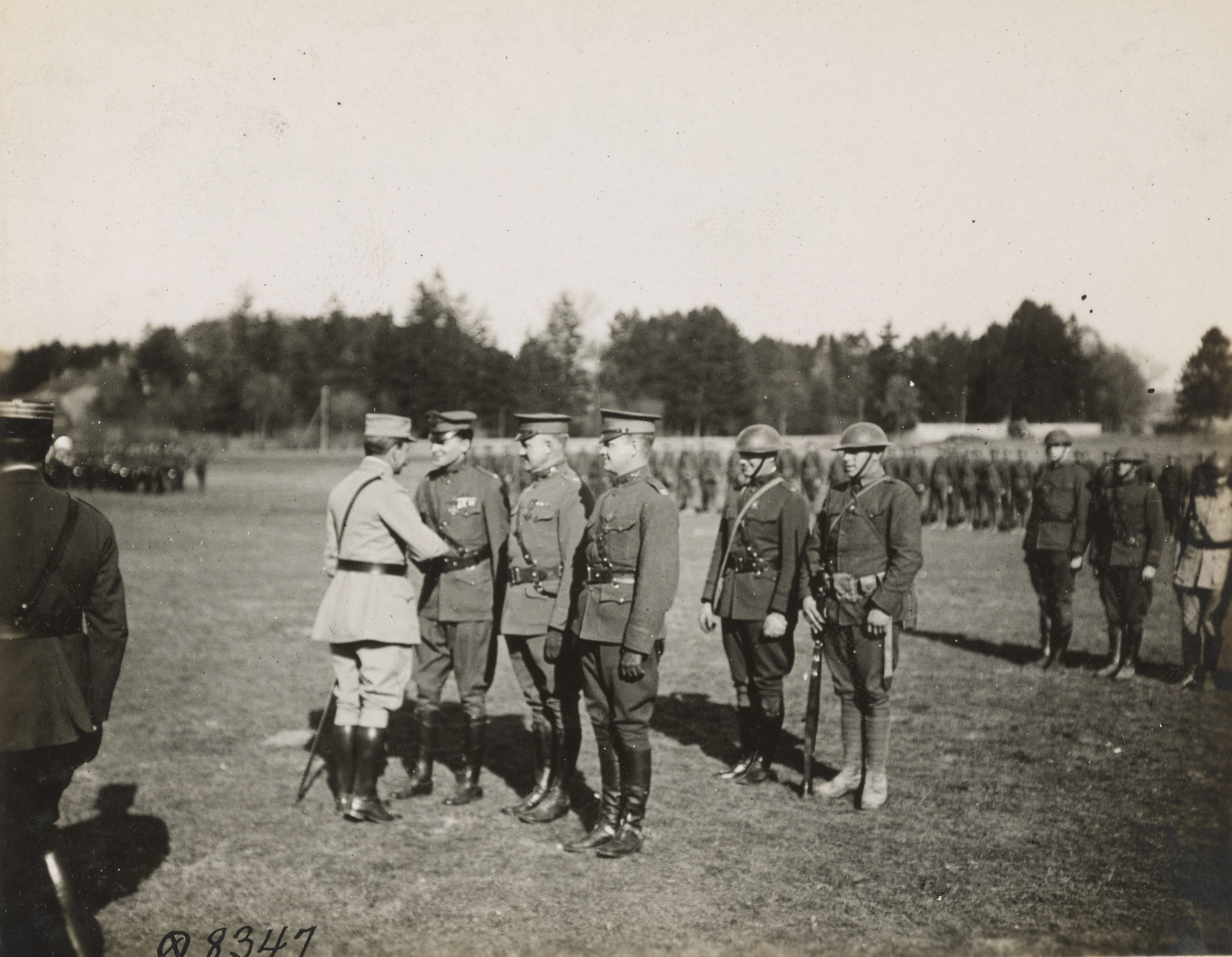
French General de Bazelaire decorating Colonel Douglas MacArthur with the Croix de Guerre, March 18, 1918.

An order by Bazelaire dated March 7, 1916, quoted by the Germans and published in the New York Times, reflects the extremely tough conditions of the fights when colonel Macker and his 92e Régiment d'infanterie were ordered to retake the Bois des Corbeaux where they demonstrated an admirable courage.

In the British weekly The Graphic (July 1916) we can read the following comments: «After the Dead Man (Mort-Homme), none of the Verdun hills has been the scene of fiercer fighting than the now famous Hill 304 (Cote 304), where for many weeks general Bazelaire has held against the hellish fire of the Crown Prince's big guns and the massed attacks of his armed hosts ».

During the offensive of the Chemin des Dames, in April 1917, the 7th Army Corps of general de Bazelaire, comprising three infantry divisions, was reinforced by the 1st and the 3rd Russian Brigades. These troops, commanded by general Nikolaï Lokhvitski, took part in the fighting near Courcy, where they behaved courageously and suffered severe losses.

In February 1918, as Douglas MacArthur recalls in his memoirs, four regiments of the 42nd Infantry Division, the Rainbow Division of the American Expeditionary Forces, « were placed under the command of General Georges de Bazelaire of the French VII Army Corps to be battle-trained with four French divisions.» Colonel MacArthur took part in what was his first raid against German trenches where several prisoners were seized, after which he was awarded a Croix de Guerre by Bazelaire.

Captain Clarence Van Schaick Mitchell, a Liaison Officer for the American Expeditionary Forces on the staff of General de Castelnau, relates a meeting he had with Bazelaire : « General de Bazelaire I met in Lunéville in April, 1918 when he was in command of a corps and our 42nd Division was under his orders. He was a tall shaggy looking man, with keen blue eyes and a very energetic, sharp manner of speaking. He questioned me about the arrival of our troops from America, said that if they were all as good as those in the 42nd Division, the Allies could ask for nothing better. He expressed his admiration for General Menoher, then commanding the Division, and was particularly enthusiastic about the then Chief of Staff, MacArthur (...) He is known for his forcefulness and unambiguous methods and our men and officers were enthusiastic about him.»

== Military Commendations ==
Georges de Bazelaire received several military citations for his services in World War I

- Croix de Guerre 1914-1918 (France)
- Allied Victory Medal (Médaille Interalliée de la Victoire) (France)
- Grand-Croix of the Legion of Honor (Légion d'honneur) (France)
- Croix de Guerre (Belgium)
- Commander of the Order of Leopold (Commandeur de l'Ordre de Léopold) (Belgium)
- Grand Officer of the Order of the Crown (Grand Officier de l'Ordre de la Couronne) (Belgium)
- Army Distinguished Service Medal – 1919 (United States)

== Documents ==
- Map of the left bank of the river Meuse, between Cumières and Avocourt, near Verdun, showing Cote 304, Le Mort-Homme and Bois des Corbeaux

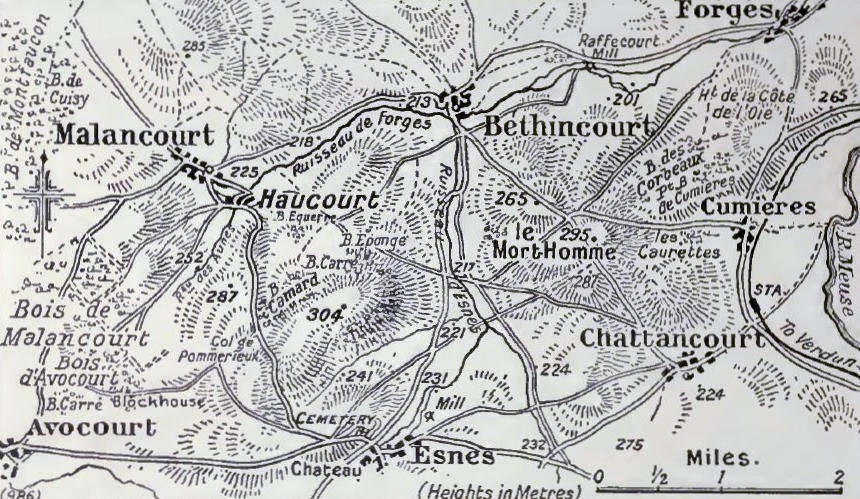
Mort-Homme and Cote 304, Verdun, 1917

- Brenda Haugen - Douglas MacArthur, America's general - Compass Point Books - Minneapolis, 2006 - pages 39 and 40, with a photograph of MacArthur with general de Bazelaire at practice maneuvers
- Review of American troops by general de Bazelaire, 23 March 1918. Photograph on the site of the Bibliothèque de Documentation internationale contemporaine (BDIC)
- General de Bazelaire, with US general Menoher (42nd Infantry Division Rainbow) and French general Gaucher, decorates 165th Infantry troops, Lunéville sector, February 2016. Historical film from the Department of Defense, US National Archives
- Documentary film including narration of the defense of the left bank of the river Meuse by general de Bazelaire and the counter-attack by colonel Macker in the Bois des Corbeaux, in : Indiana Neidell, The Great War - Week by week 100 years later - Week 85
