= Fort de la Pompelle =

- Part of Fortifications of Reims, Séré de Rivières system
- Sillery, France
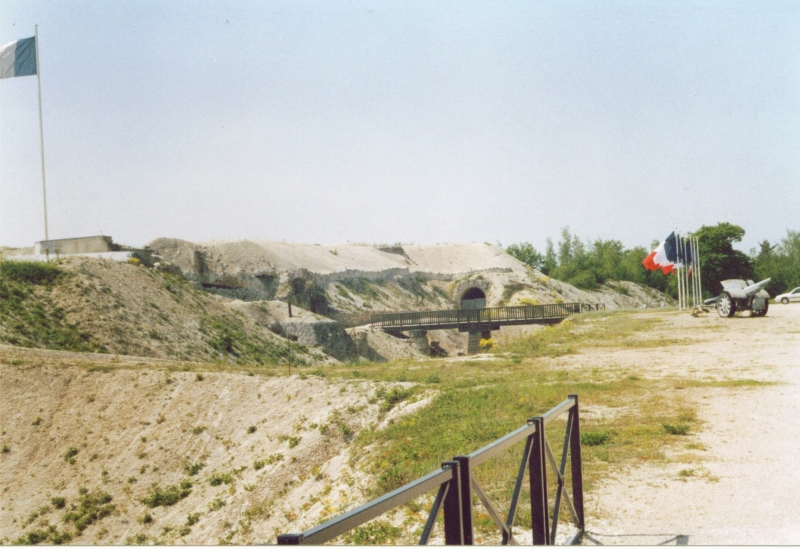

Site information
- Type: Fort
- Owner: City of Reims
- Controlled by: France
- Open to the public: Yes
- Condition: Ruin

Location
- Coordinates: 49.21608°N 4.12899°E

Site history
- Built: 1880
- Materials: Stone, brick
- Battles/wars: First Battle of the Marne, Second Battle of the Marne

The Fort de la Pompelle, also known as Fort Herbillon, is one of a number of forts built around Reims after 1870 as part of a fortification belt in the Séré de Rivières system. The forts saw combat during the First World War in the defense of Reims. The fort is located about 2 kilometres (1.2 mi) north of the town of Sillery, next to the N44 road, between Reims and Châlons-en-Champagne. Constructed as a supporting position for larger forts and disarmed in 1913, it saw the heaviest fighting of the Reims forts. It was bombarded during the war and remains in a state of ruin.

== Description ==
The Fort de la Pompelle was built between 1880 and 1883 to complete the fortification belt around Reims that was started by General Raymond Adolphe Séré de Rivières after the Franco-Prussian War of 1870. This secondary work was planned to support the principal forts of Witry-les-Reims, Nogent-l'Abbesse, Brimont, Saint-Thierry, Fresnes and Montbré. The relatively small rectangular fort was surrounded by a ditch defended by two-level caponiers. With a surface area of 2.31 hectares (5.7 acres), it was provided with six 155mm de Bange 1881 guns, four 138mm guns and a variety of lesser pieces. An artillery company of 277 men garrisoned the fort. In 1917-18 a number of underground passages were cut from the chalk to provide access points a few hundred meters to the rear of the fort.

== First World War ==
The fort was disarmed in 1913, immediately prior to the First World War. During the offensives of 1914, the fort was briefly taken by German forces on 4 September. Following the First Battle of the Marne it was reoccupied by French forces of the 138th Infantry Regiment on 24 September 1914. The fort then became a principal part in the defense of the Reims sector. In the remainder of the war, the fort was assaulted and bombarded many times by the Germans, but never changed hands again.

A total of 180 different regiments, including two special Russian brigades sent by Tsar Nicholas II in 1916 would defend the fort in turn. The garrison was supported by naval artillery stationed on the canal between Sept Saulx and Courmelois, which bombarded the German lines. The fort saw particularly strong assaults in the spring of 1918 in the Second Battle of the Marne, when it was assaulted three times, on 1 June with fifteen tanks. Each assault was repelled by the elements of the 1st Colonial Infantry Corps.

The fort was depicted in the 1931 Raymond Bernard movie Les Croix de Bois.

== Abandonment and restoration ==
After the First World War, the Fort de la Pompelle was abandoned for nearly forty years and was finally listed for sale by the Administration des Domaines in November 1955. Supported by veterans' groups, the fort was purchased by the Fédération Nationale André Maginot which sold the site to the city of Reims for one symbolic franc.

== Musée du Fort de la Pompelle ==
Classified as an historic monument on 23 March 1922, the fort is today a museum, inaugurated on 10 November 1972. The museum features an unusual collection of German army headgear, collected by Charles Freise.

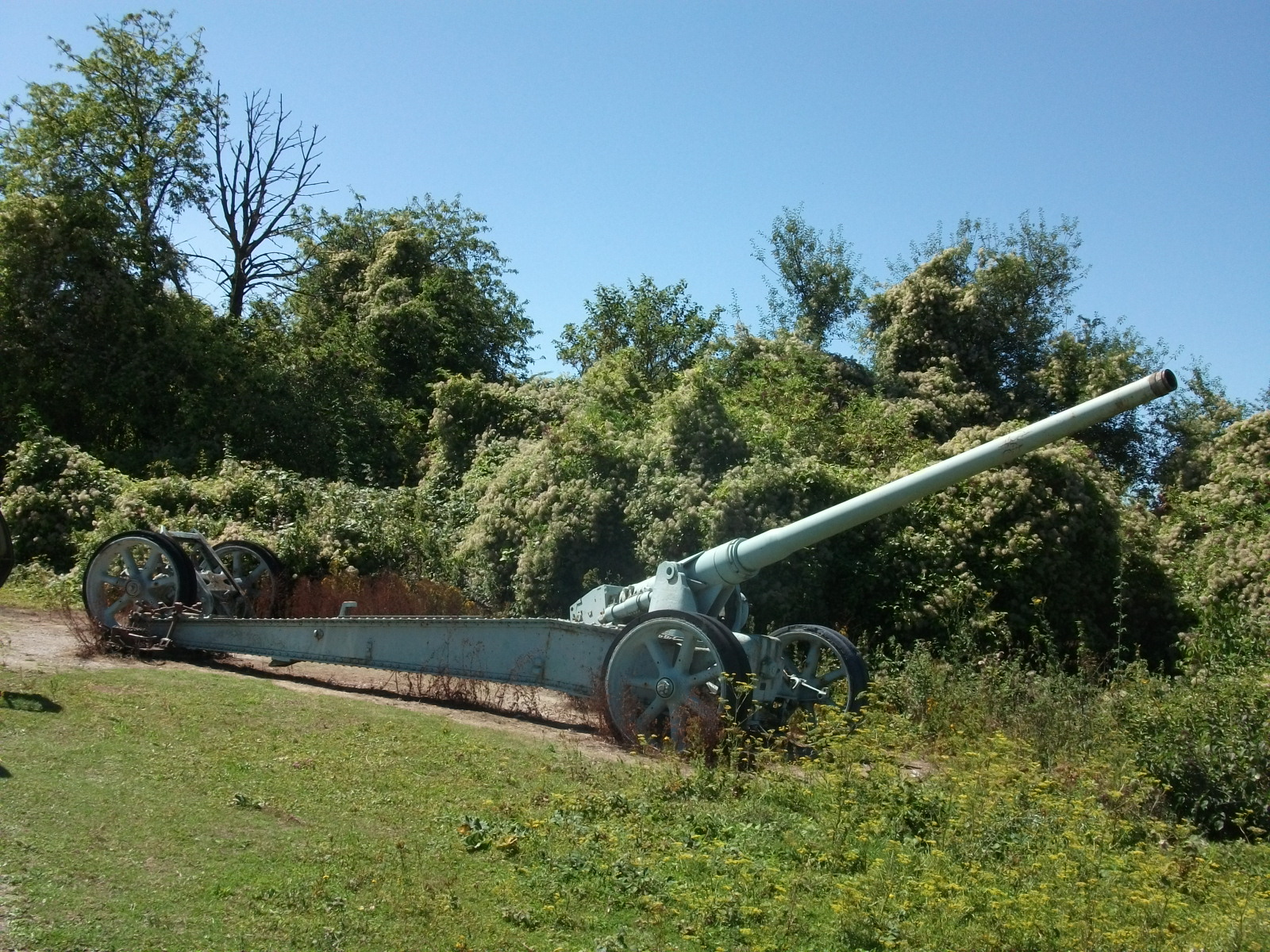
Canon de 155mm GPF.

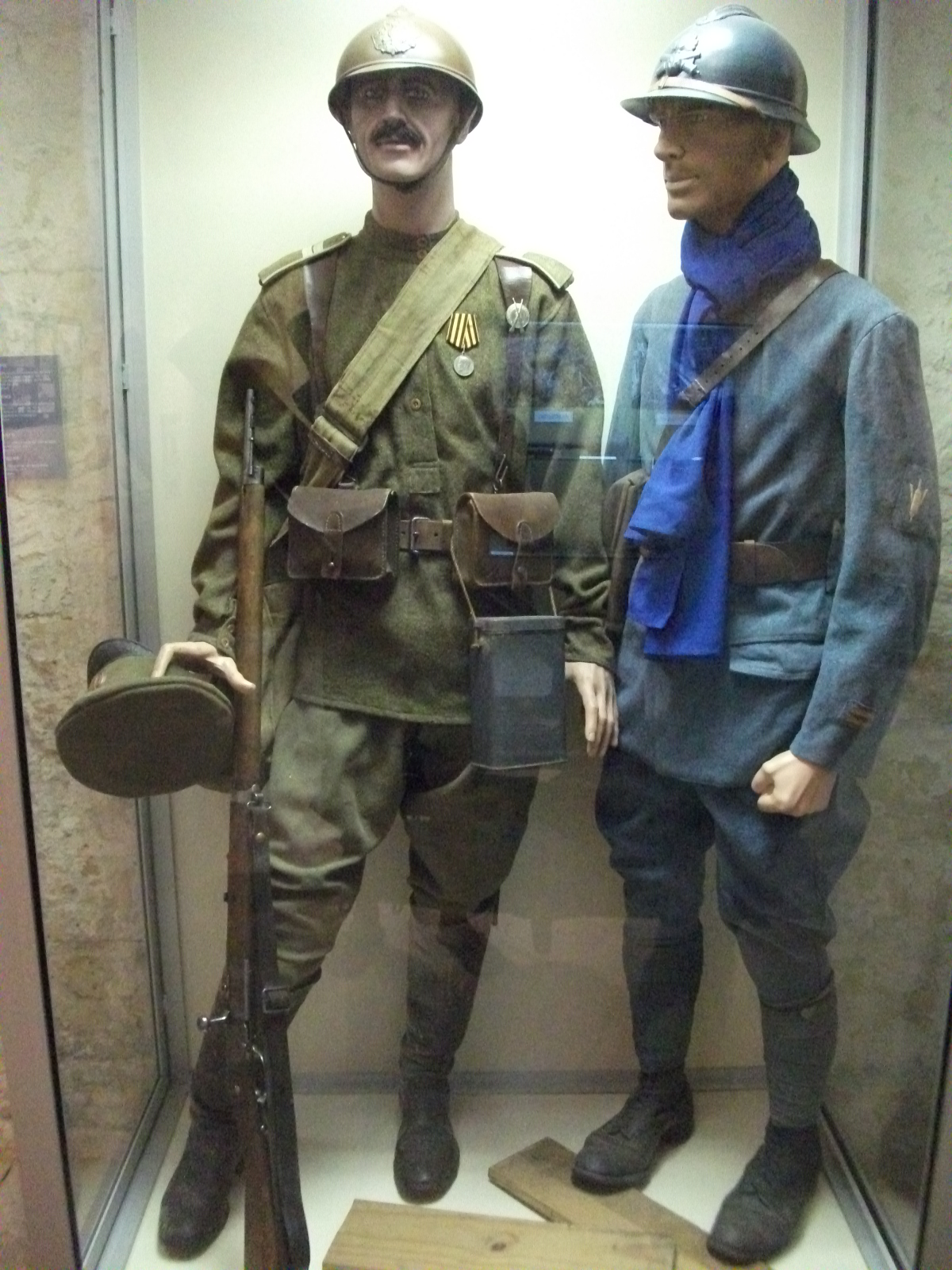
Russian infantry sergeant and French artillery lieutenant.

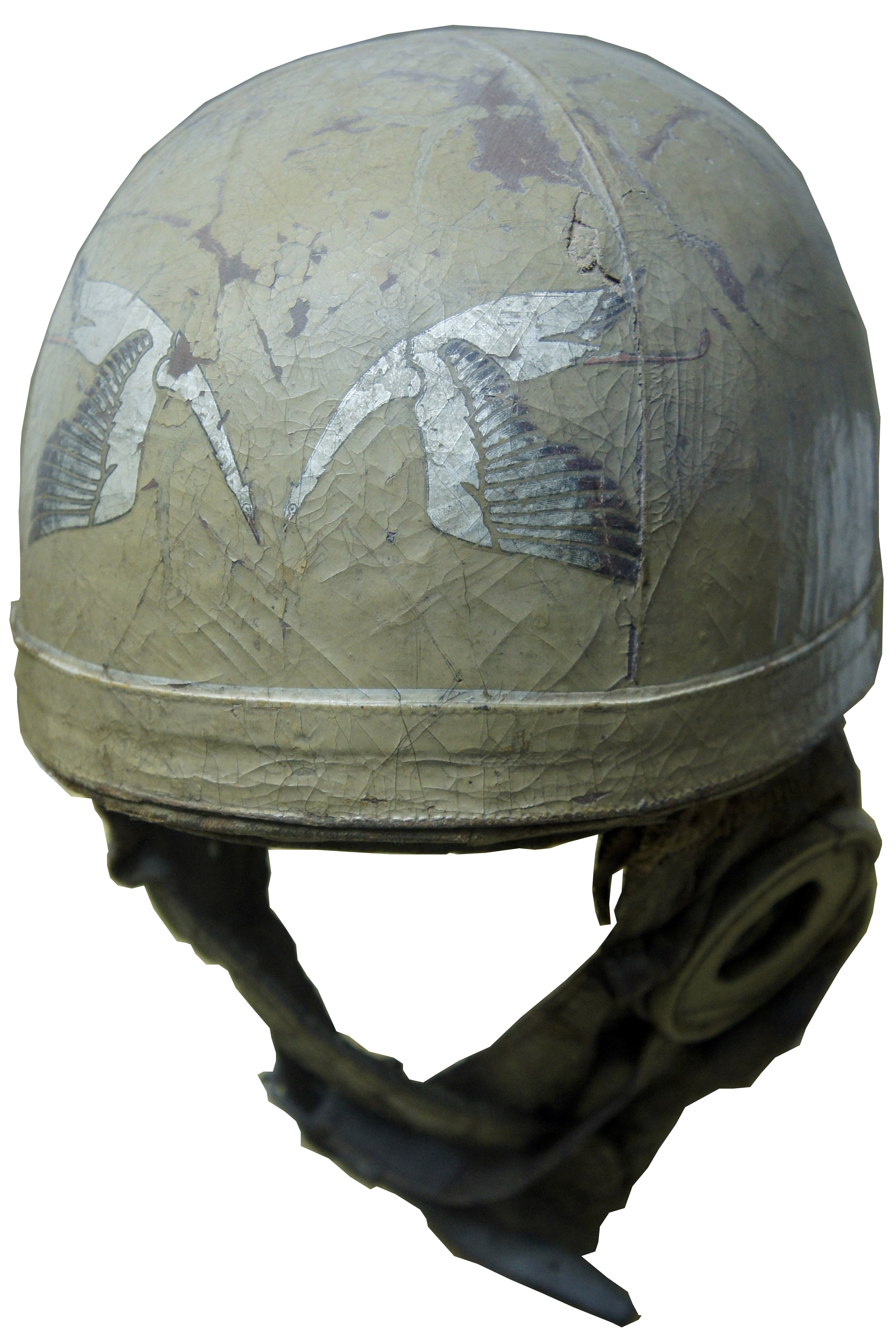
Cigognes squadron helmet.

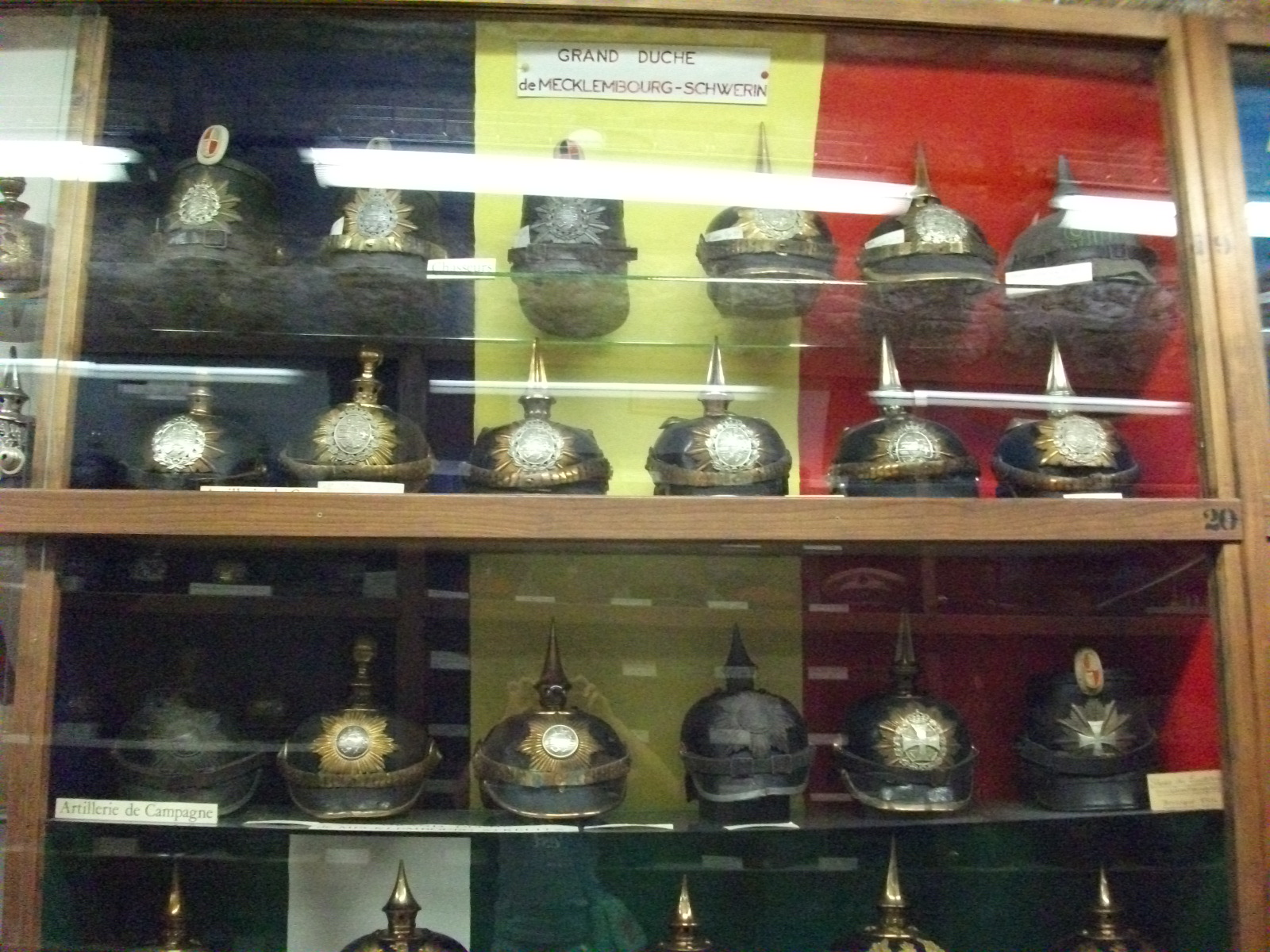
Helmets from the Grand Duchy of Mecklenburg-Schwerin.

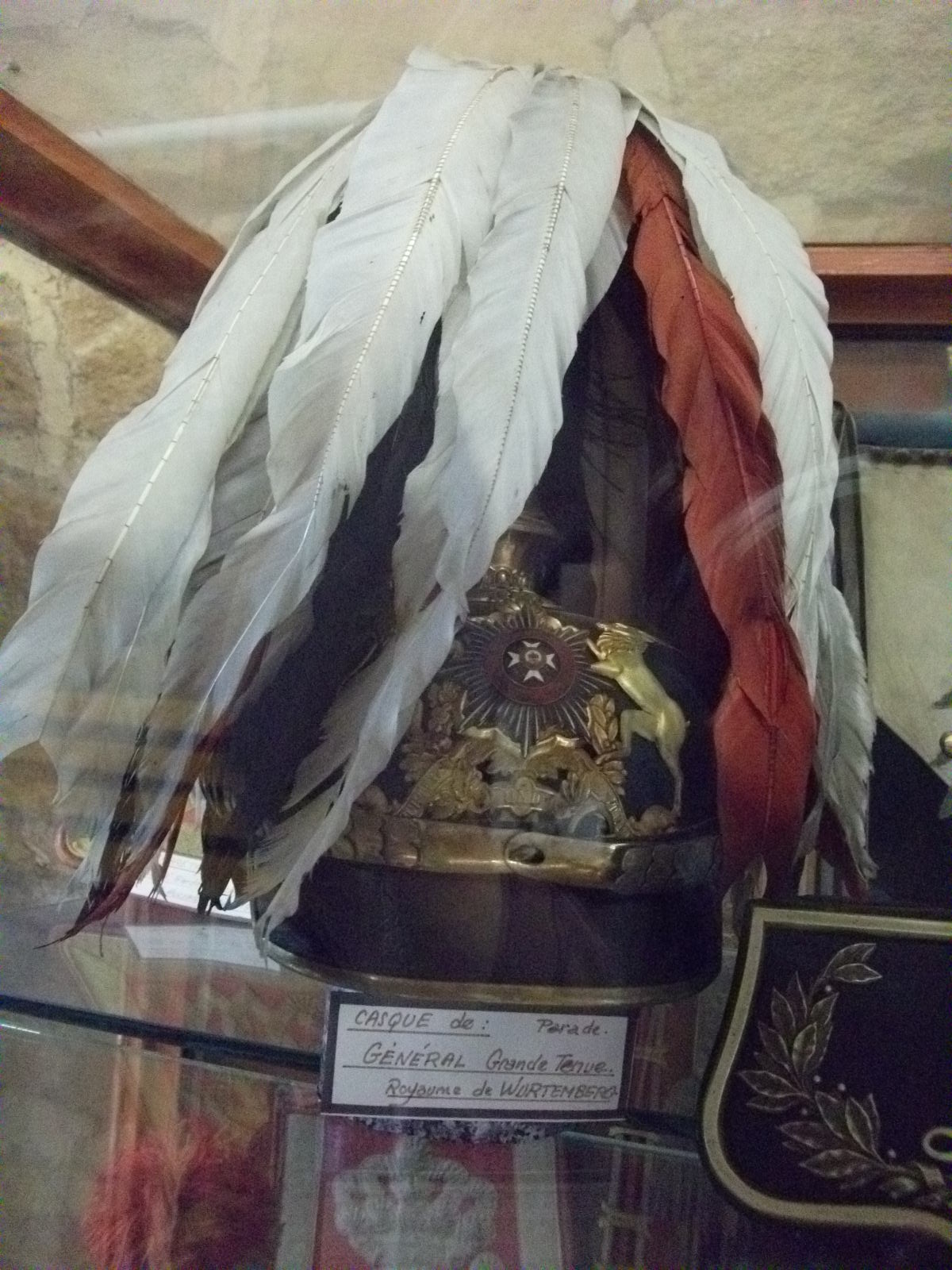
General's helmet from the Württemberg .

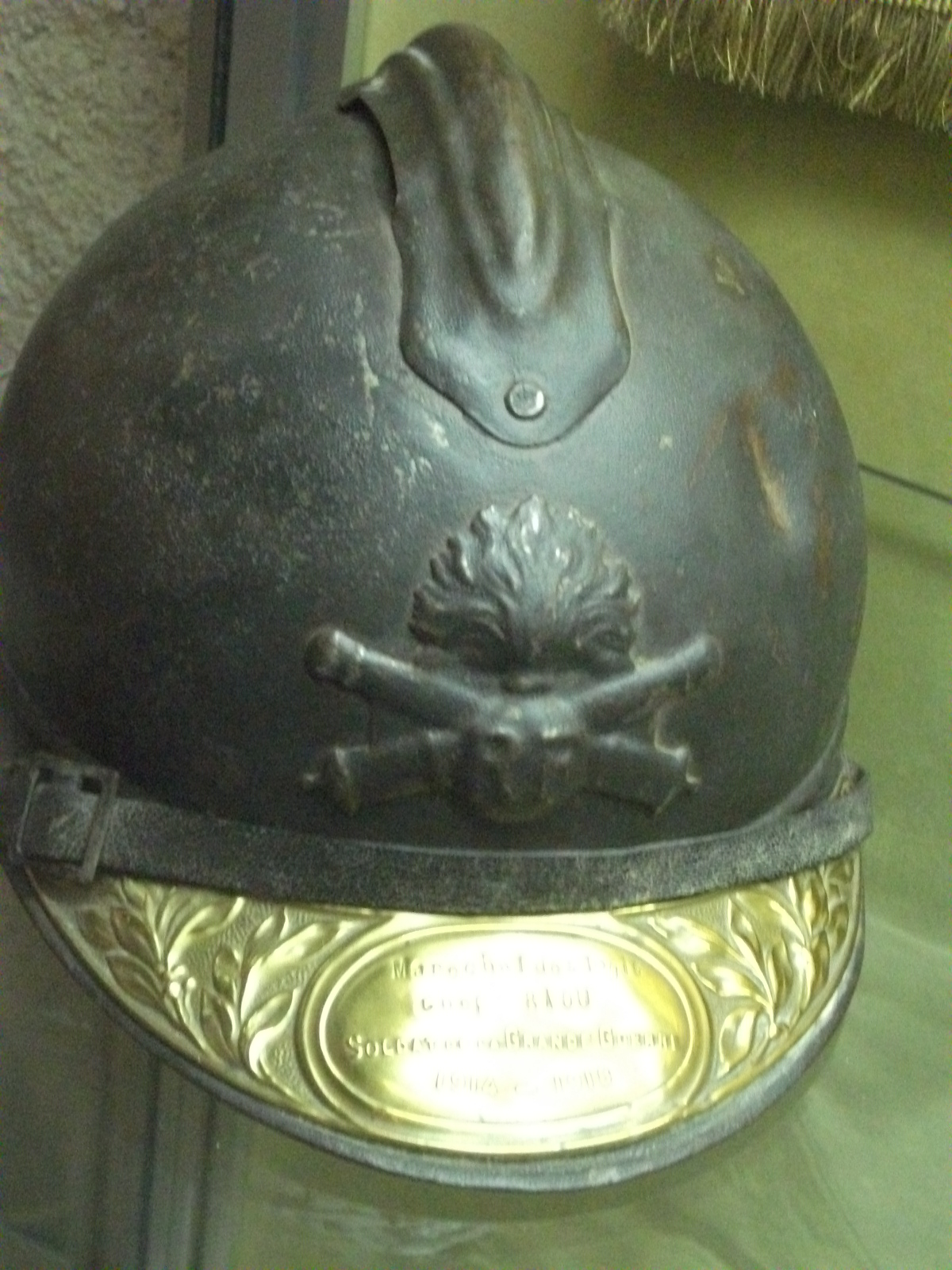
Adrian helmet.

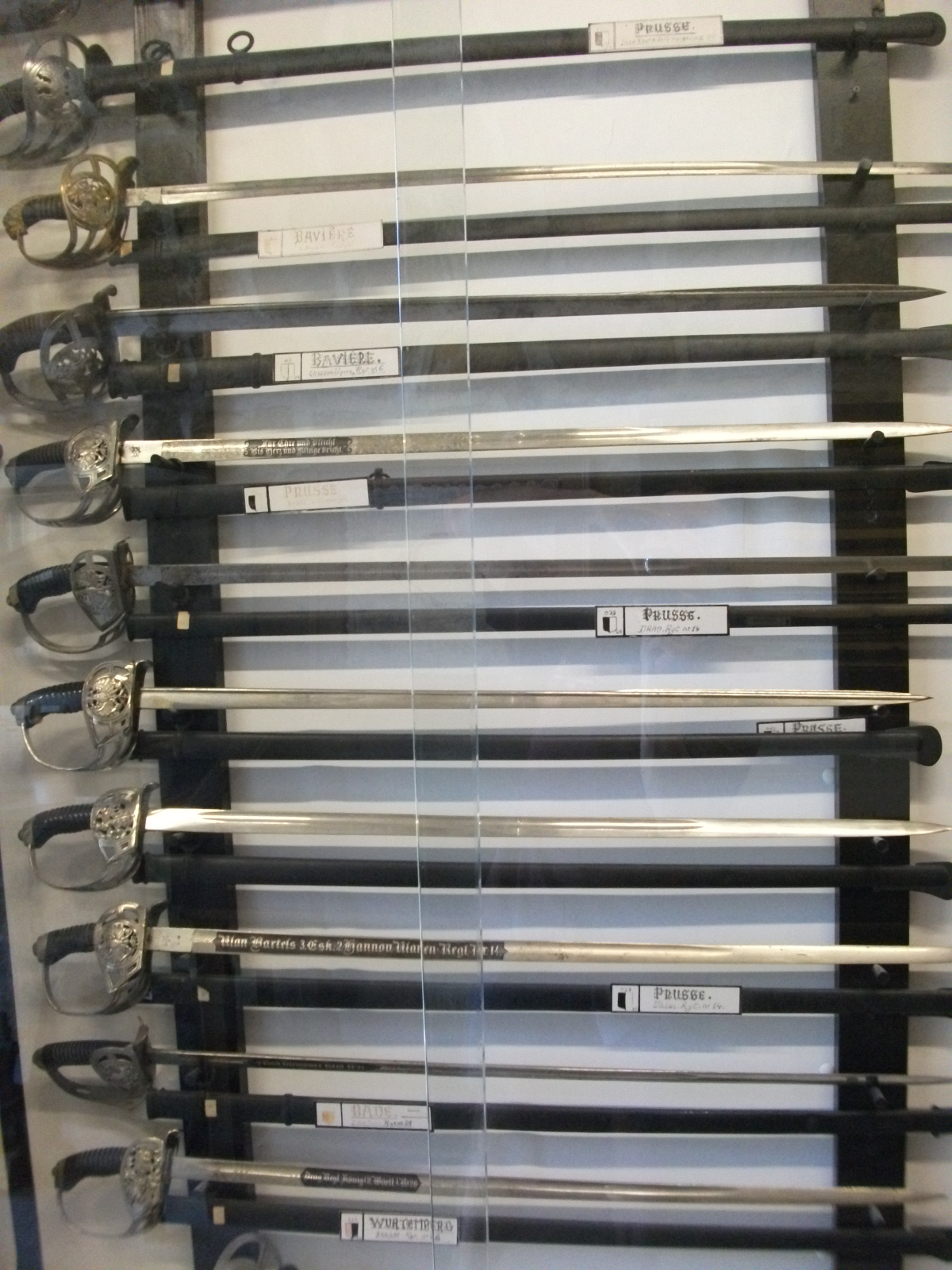
Smallswords of the German kingdoms.

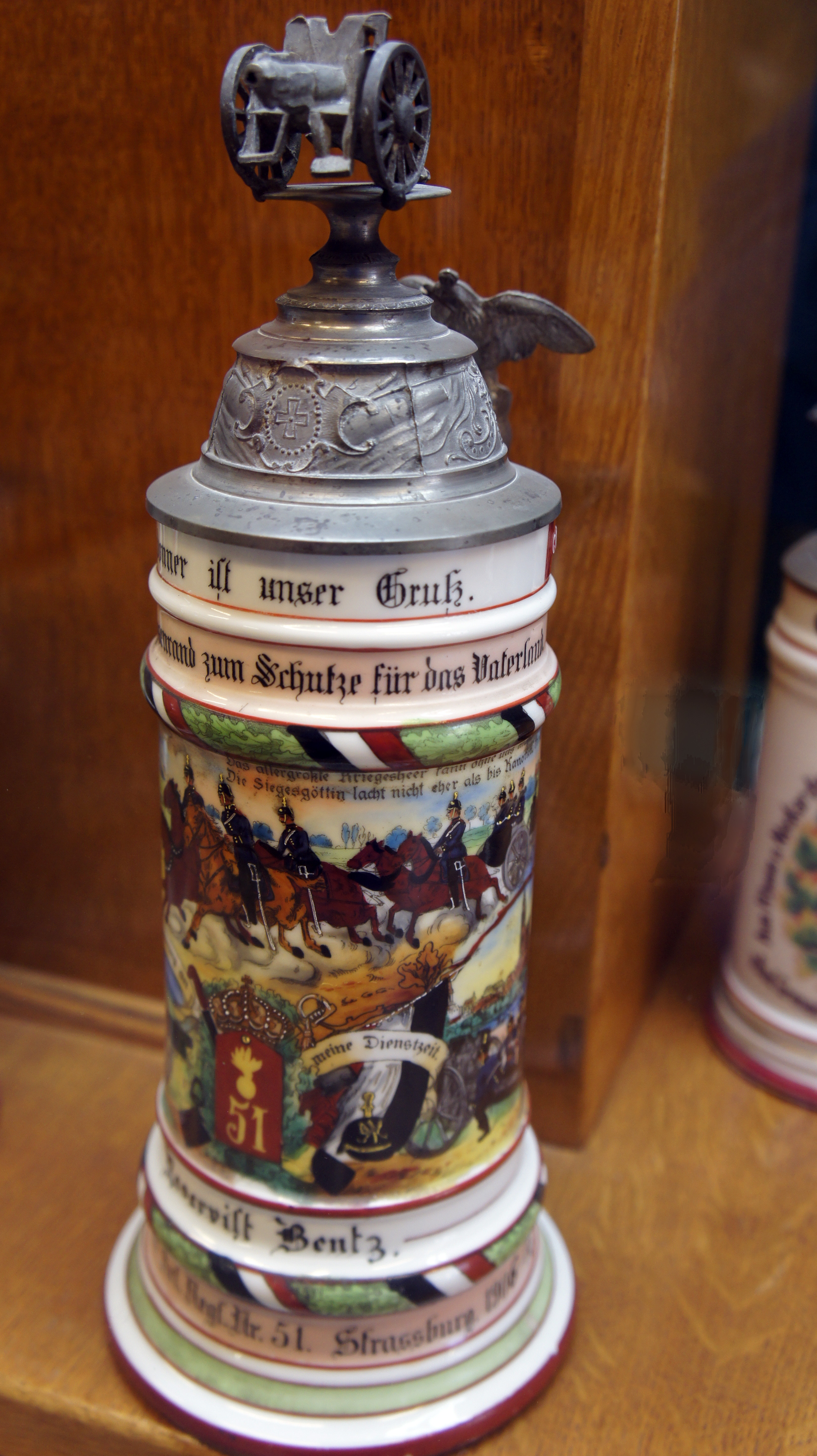
Beer stein.

== See also ==
- Russian Expeditionary Force in France
