= Nikolai Lokhvitsky =

Russian military personnel (1867–1933)

Nikolai Aleksandrovich Lokhvitsky
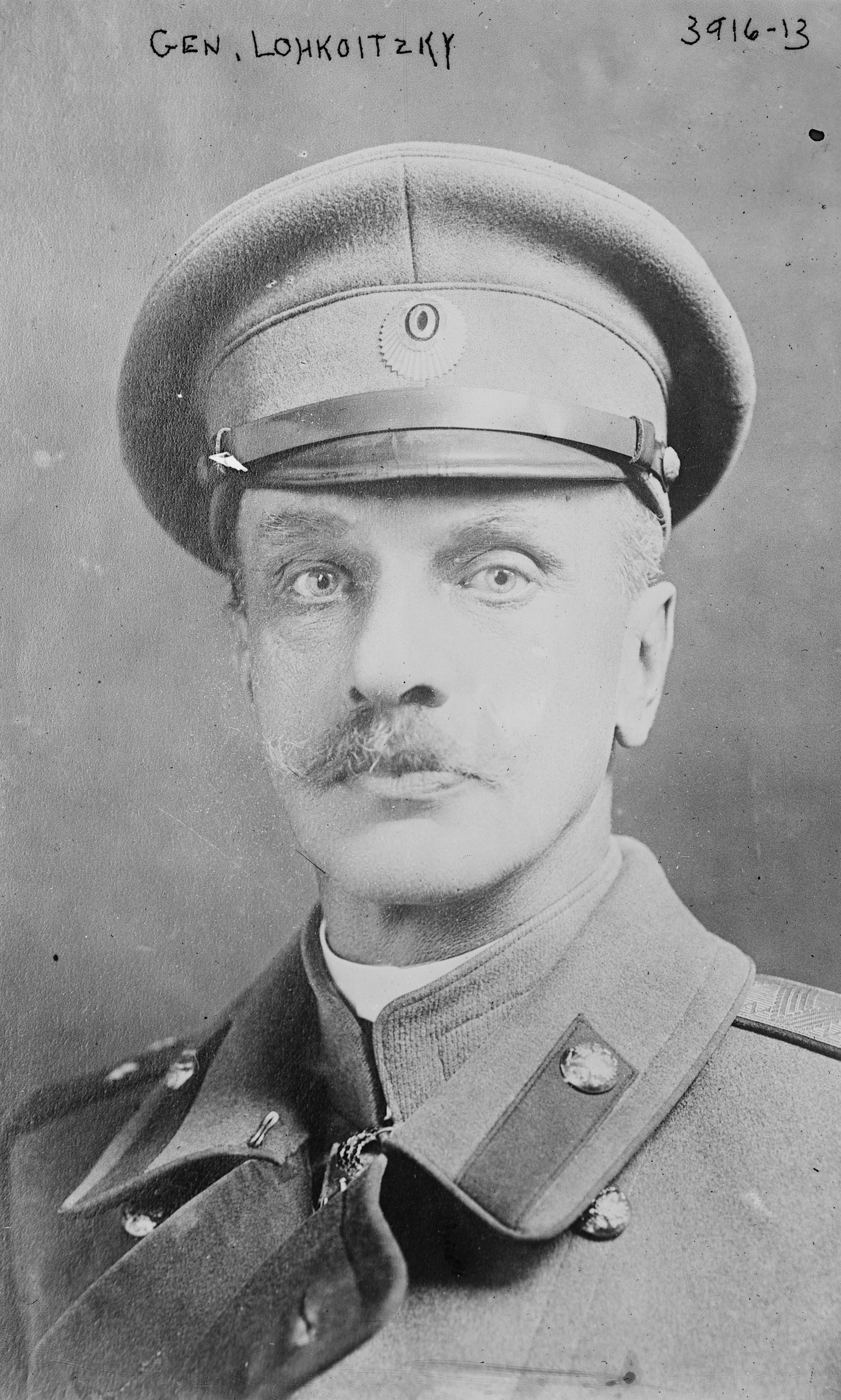
- Born: 7 October [O.S. 25 September] 1867; Saint Petersburg
- Died: 5 November 1933 (aged 66)
- Burial place: Sainte-Geneviève-des-Bois Russian Cemetery
- Military career
- Allegiance: Russian Empire White movement
- Branch: Imperial Russian Army; White Army
- Rank: Lieutenant General
- Commands: Russian Imperial Army
- Conflicts: Western Front; Second Battle of the Aisne; Second Battle of the Marne; Macedonian front; Battle of Monastir (1916); Battle of Monastir (1917); Russian Civil War; Great Siberian Ice March
- Awards: Légion d’honneur

Nikolai Aleksandrovich Lokhvitsky (Russian: Никола́й Алекса́ндрович Ло́хвицкий; 7 October 1868 – 5 November 1933) was a general in the Russian Expeditionary Force in France.

== Family background ==
He came from an aristocratic family near Saint Petersburg. He was the son of a barrister, Alexander V. Lokhvitsky (1830–1884). The poet, Mirra Lokhvitskaya, was his sister whose brief career ended in 1907.Teffi, another sister, was also a writer who despite initially supporting the Bolshevik seizure of power, left for exile in Paris where she became a prominent writer in the white émigré community in France.

== Army career ==
He joined the 4th Moscow Cadet Corps on 9 January 1887.

Lokhvitsky took command of the First brigade of the REF leaving Moscow on 2 February 1916. They travelled by train across Siberia to the port of Dal'ny. Here, they sailed on four ships via the Suez Canal to Marseille, arriving in April 1916. They were billeted at the training camp at Mailly-le-Camp, Champagne. When they were joined by the 3rd brigade in September 1916, they were merged into a Division at Mourmelon-le-Grand also in Champagne.

== Russian Civil War ==
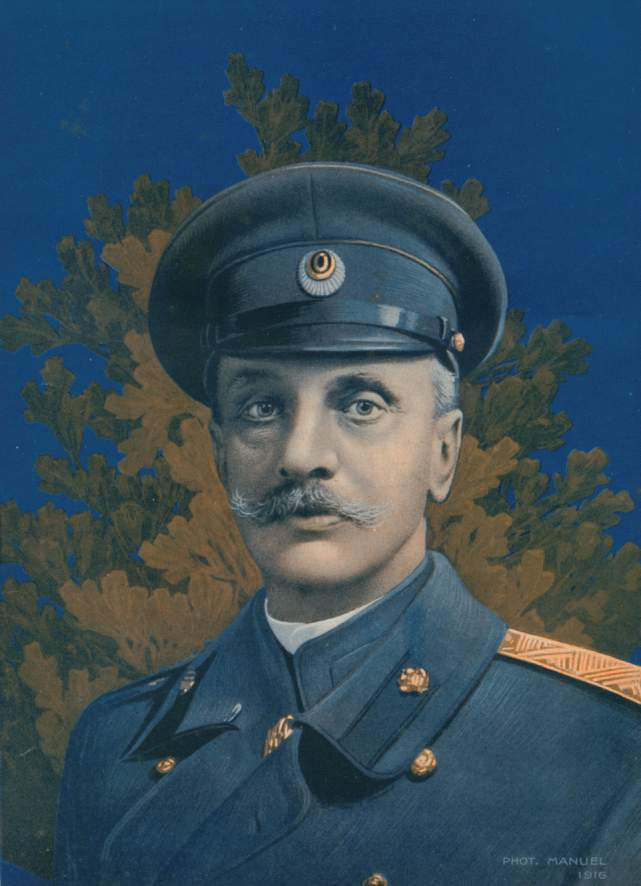

In 1919, he joined the forces of Admiral Kolchak in Siberia. From April to June 1919 he commanded the 3rd Ural Corps and the 1st Army and finally, after the reorganization, the 2nd Army. He was replaced in August 1919 by General Wojciechowski. He participated in the Great Siberian Ice March and was sent ahead by Kolchak to Irkutsk to prepare for the transfer of the staff to this city and to negotiate with Ataman Semenov.

From April to August 1920, he commanded the Far East Army, from August to December he was Chief of the General Staff. In October 1920, he rejected the overall command of Semenov and recognized General Baron Wrangel as the commander-in-chief of the Russian armed forces.

== Life in exile ==
He returned to Paris in 1923. From 1927 he was the chairman of the Legitimist Monarchist Society, and worked with Grand Duke Kirill Vladimirovich.

He died in Paris and was buried in the Russian cemetery at Sainte-Genevieve-des-Bois.
