= Russian Expeditionary Forces in France and the Balkans electoral district =

Legislative constituency of the Russian Republic

The Russian Expeditionary Forces in France and the Balkans (Russian: избирательный округ русских экспедиционных войск во Франции и на Балканах) formed an electoral district for the 1917 Russian Constituent Assembly election. The constituency had some 20,000 eligible voters. The Russian troops in France and the Balkans were supposed to elect one assembly member each by majority vote, and the assembly member would not be replaced in case the seat would become vacant. However, no electoral result was available from the district.
