= Battle of Monastir (1917) =

Battle fought during WWI

- Part of Macedonian front (World War I)
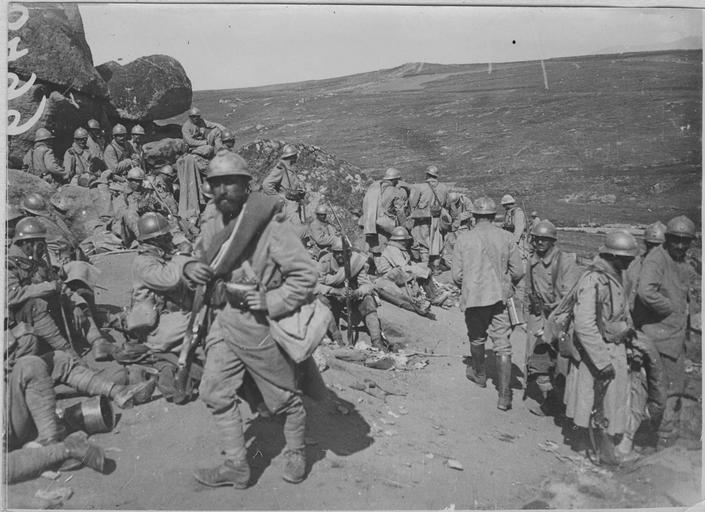
- French troops before the attack at Cerna Makovo on 9th May 1917
Date	12 March 1917 – 26 May 1917
Location	West and North of Monastir, Bulgarian-occupied Kingdom of Serbia (present-day North Macedonia)
Result	Central Powers victory

Belligerents
Bulgaria; Germany	France

Commanders and leaders
(German Empire) Otto von Below	(French Third Republic) Maurice Sarrail

Strength
(Tsardom of Bulgaria (1908–1946)) First Army (German Empire) 11th Army	5 French divisions

Casualties and losses
Unknown	14,000 killed, wounded or sick

The Battle of Monastir (1917) was a failed French attack against German-Bulgarian fortifications North and West of Monastir, between 12 March and 26 May 1917, during the Salonika Campaign in World War I.

The battle consisted of a series of operations and is known by several names. In French, it is known as Bataille de la cote 1248 (Battle of Hill 1248) and Bataille de Pelister (or Péristéri) after the Pelister mountain. In Bulgarian, it is named after the Chervena Stena or Crvena Stena ridge in the Pelister mountain range. This could be translated as the Battle of the Red Wall, but that name was not used in French or English. Another name for the engagement is the Battle of Lake Prespa.

== Background ==
In November 1916, though the Entente had managed to capture Monastir, they couldn't use the city because it was within the range of the Bulgarian artillery in the Pelister mountain range to the West and Hill 1248 to the north of the city. The Allied commander-in-chief, Maurice Sarrail, made plans for a large spring offensive in 1917, besides attacking the Crna Bend and Doiran, he also planned an attack north and west of Monastir to give the city, which was always under fire, a more expansive breathing space.

For this attack, Sarrail disposed of five infantry divisions: the French 57th, 11th Colonial, 16th Colonial, 76th and 156th Infantry Divisions.

== Battle ==
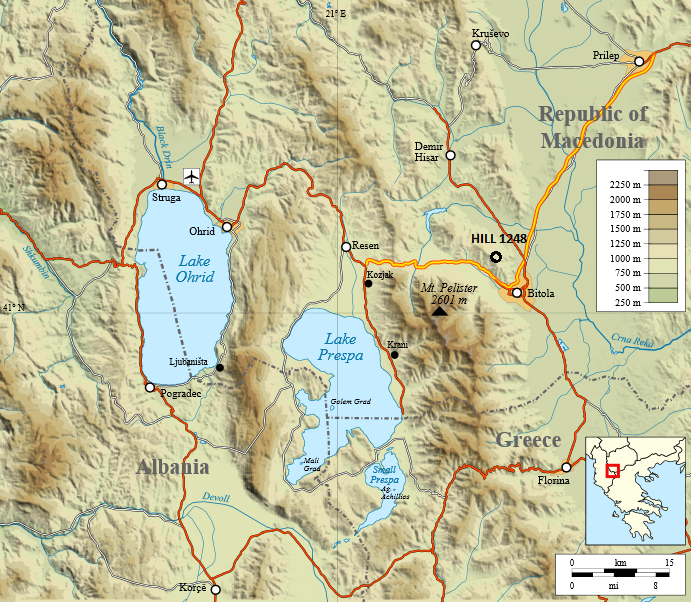
Location of Hill 1248 and Pelister mountain range

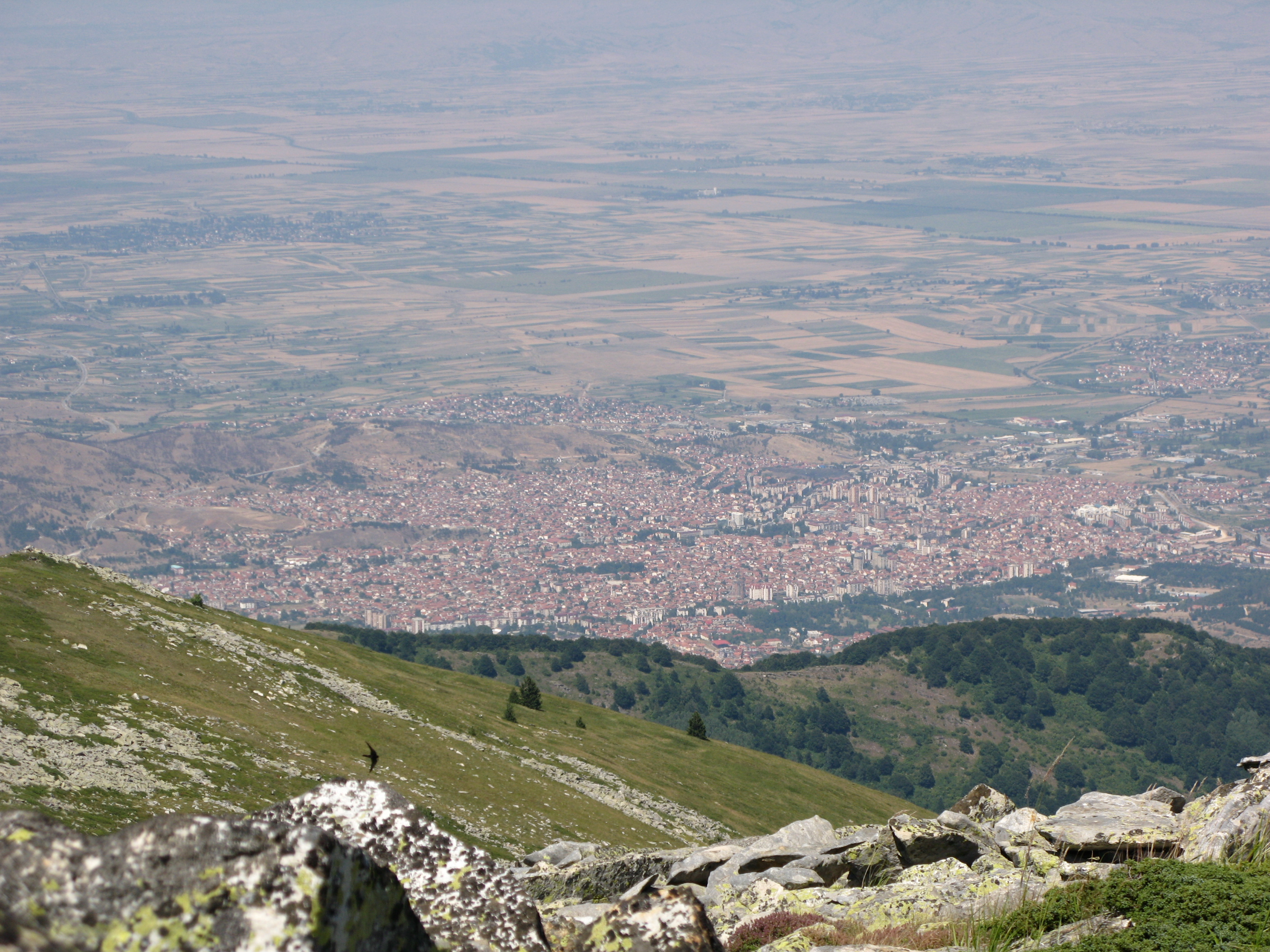
Monastir (today known as Bitola) seen from Pelister

Sarrail planned to attack the German and Bulgarian line between the Lakes Ohrid and Prespa and to launch a frontal attack North from Monastir against Hill 1248. On 11 March, the operations between the two lakes began with an intense bombardment and an attack by the 76th French Division against the Crvena Stena west of Monastir, where they captured some strong entrenchments around the villages of Dihovo, Tirnova (Tirnovo) and Snegovo. But resistance from Central Powers forces proved more vigorous than expected, which, combined with the terrible weather, caused the attack to fail.

The French attack on Hill 1248, which was to be delivered simultaneously, did not commence until the 14th. On the 18th, after four days of intense engagements, the French captured the whole of Hill 1248 as well as the fortified village of Krklino (also named Krklina, Kir-Klina, Kerklino, Kerklina, etc.), taking 1,200 prisoners. But the Central Powers succeeded, by a counter-attack, in recapturing part of Hill 1248, whose summit remained abandoned by both sides. Monastir was somewhat relieved, but the town remained under fire until the Armistice, when more than half of it had been destroyed by the 20,700 shells dropped on it. Some 500 inhabitants were killed and 650 injured.

The Bulgarians also retook the Chervena Stena on 18 May.

== Consequences ==
This French defeat meant that the whole spring offensive of 1917 left the allies with no results at all.

For the Bulgarians, this victory was a significant boost in morale, and there were even comparisons made with the historic victory in the Battle of Shipka Pass against the Turks in 1877.

== See also ==
- Russian Expeditionary Force in France
