= Second Battle of the Marne =

1918 battle in the Western Front of World War I

- Part of the Western Front of World War I
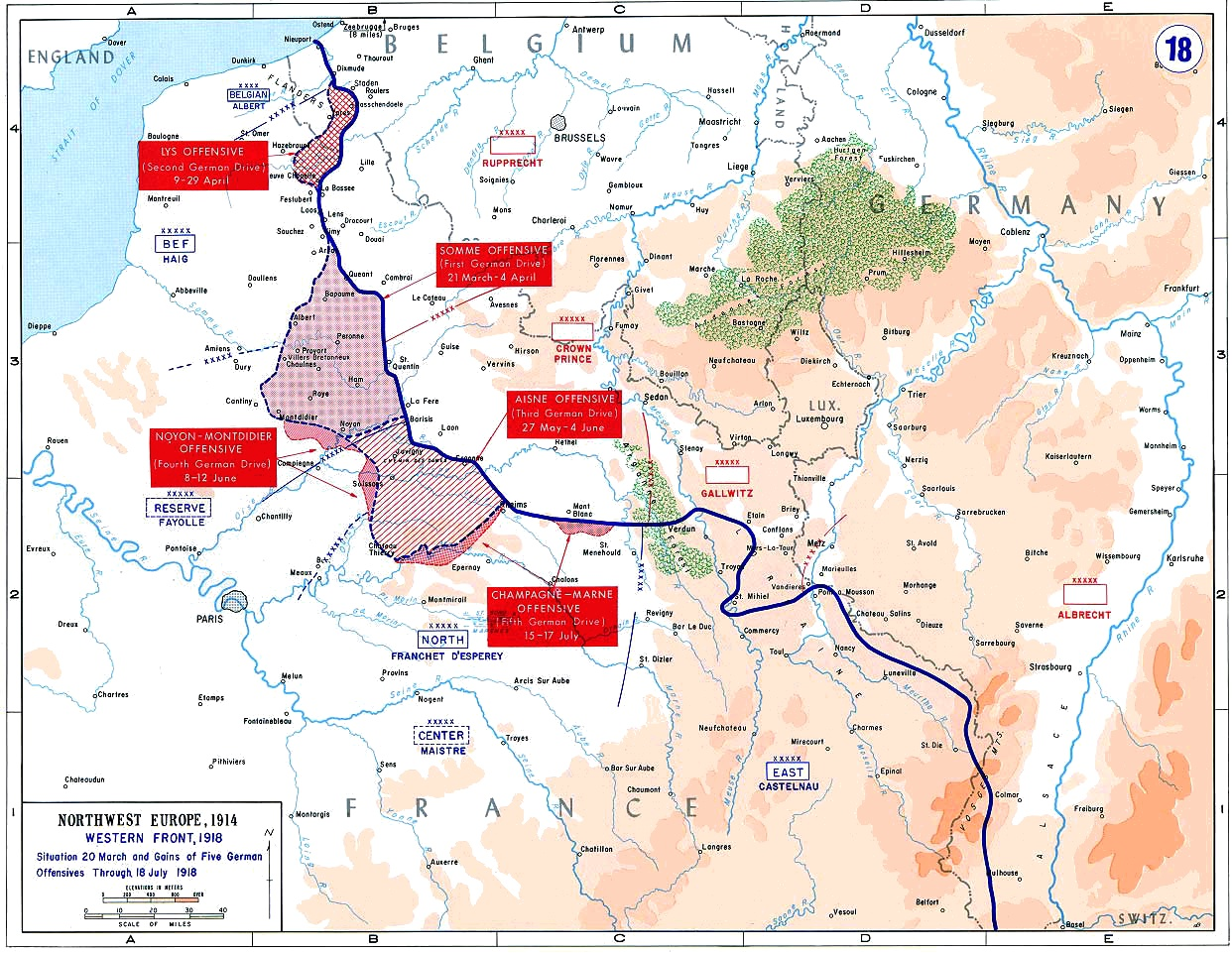
- German offensives, 1918
Date	15 July – 18 July 1918
Location	Marne River near Paris, France 49°5′N 3°40′E
Result	Entente victory

Belligerents
Entente Powers: (French Third Republic) France; United States (United Kingdom of Great Britain and Ireland) United Kingdom (Kingdom of Italy) Italy (Russian Republic) Russia	Germany

Commanders and leaders
(French Third Republic) Ferdinand Foch (French Third Republic) Paul Maistre (French Third Republic) Émile Fayolle (French Third Republic) Henri Gouraud (French Third Republic) Charles Mangin (French Third Republic) Antoine de Mitry (French Third Republic) Henri Berthelot (French Third Republic) Jean Degoutte (United States) John J. Pershing (United Kingdom of Great Britain and Ireland) Alexander Godley (Kingdom of Italy) Alberico Albricci (Russian Republic) Nikolai Lokhvitsky	(German Empire) Erich Ludendorff (German Empire) Karl von Einem (German Empire) Bruno von Mudra (German Empire) Max von Boehn (German Empire) Johannes von Eben

Strength
44 French divisions 8 American divisions 4 British divisions 2 Italian divisions Total: 58 divisions 408 heavy guns 360 field batteries 346 tanks	52 divisions 609 heavy guns 1,047 field batteries

Casualties and losses
Total: 133,051 (French Third Republic) 95,165 (United Kingdom of Great Britain and Ireland) 16,552 (United States) 12,000 (Kingdom of Italy) 9,334	168,000 casualties (including 29,367 captured); 793 guns lost

The Second Battle of the Marne (French: Seconde Bataille de la Marne; 15 – 18 July 1918) was the last major German offensive on the Western Front during the First World War. The attack failed when an Allied counterattack, led by French forces and supported by several hundred Renault FT tanks, overwhelmed the Germans on their right flank, inflicting severe casualties. The German defeat marked the start of the relentless Allied advance which culminated in an armistice with Germany about 100 days later.

== Background ==
Following the failure of the German spring offensive to end the conflict, Erich Ludendorff, Chief Quartermaster General, believed that an attack through Flanders would give Germany a decisive victory over the British Expeditionary Force (BEF). To shield his intentions and draw Allied troops away from Belgium, Ludendorff planned for a large diversionary attack along the Marne.

== German attack ==
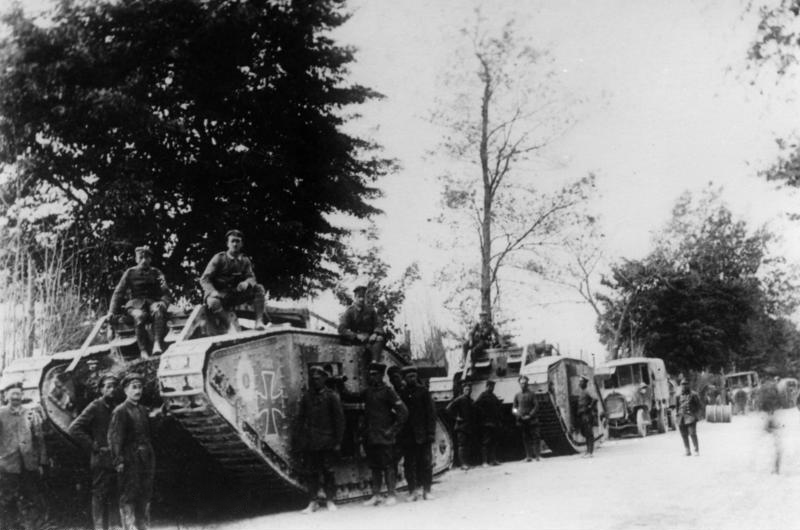
Captured British Mark IV tanks used by German troops

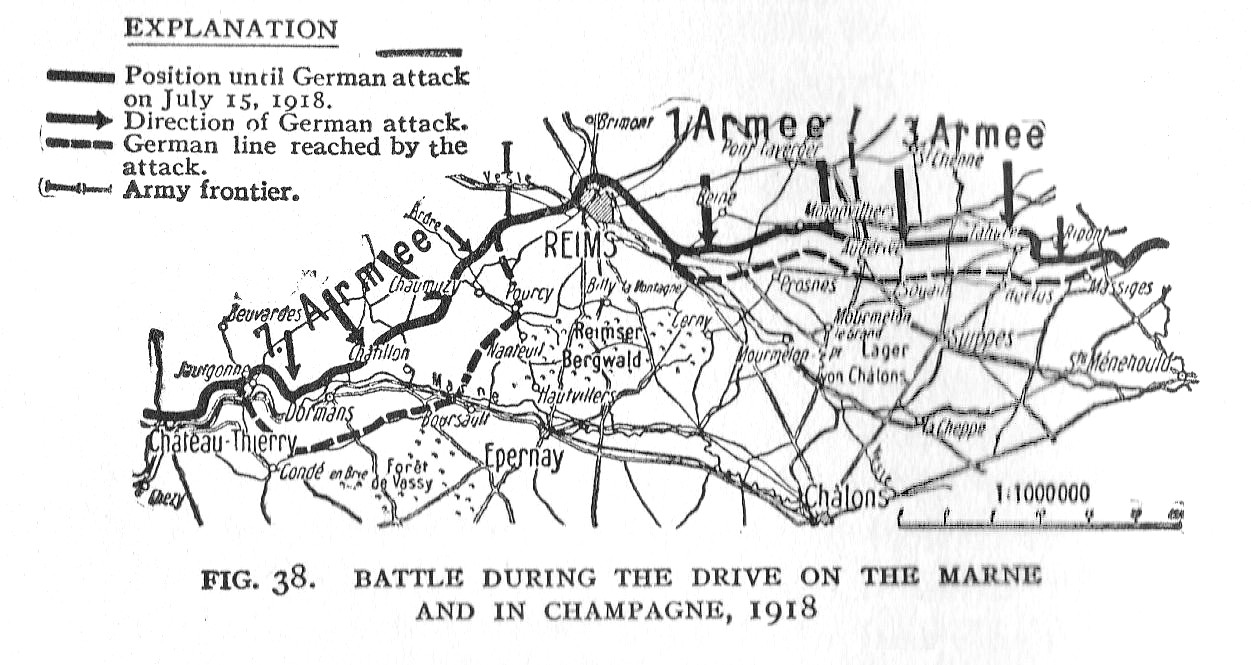

The battle began in the early morning of 15 July, when 23 German divisions of the First and Third armies – led by Bruno von Mudra and Karl von Einem – assaulted the French Fourth Army under Henri Gouraud east of Reims (the Fourth Battle of Champagne (French: 4e Bataille de Champagne)). The U.S. 42nd Division was attached to the French Fourth Army. Meanwhile, 17 divisions of the German Seventh Army, under Max von Boehn, aided by the Ninth Army under Johannes von Eben, attacked the French Sixth Army led by Jean Degoutte to the west of Reims (the Battle of the Mountain of Reims (French: Bataille de la Montagne de Reims)). Ludendorff hoped to split the French in two.

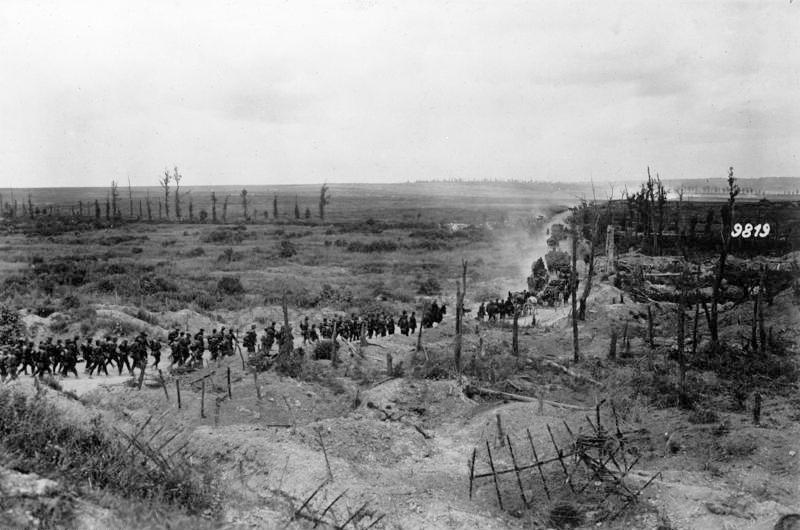
"German columns pass a conquered French position between Loivre and Brimont in the department of Marne." 1918. Credit to the German Archives.

East of Reims, the French Fourth Army had prepared a defense in depth to counter an intense bombardment and infiltrating infantry. Their main line of resistance was four to five km behind the front, beyond the range of the enemy field guns, it was a continuous trench line – to prevent infiltration – dug on a reverse slope so it could not be overlooked by enemy artillery observers on the ground. Between the front and the main line of resistance were two lines of strong points, again mostly on reverse slopes. The French gun line behind the front was lightly manned, but the remaining guns fired frequently, so the Germans did not detect its weakness from rate of firing, although aerial observers did spot a concentration of field guns behind the main line of resistance. German offensive tactics stressed surprise, but French intelligence based on aerial observation gave clear warning and they learned the hour for the attack from twenty-seven prisoners taken in a trench raid.

The German bombardment was scheduled for 12:10. The French opened fire on the German assault trenches at 11:30, naturally shaking the confidence of attackers. When the Germans opened fire they pounded the almost empty French front line and their counter-battery fire struck many vacated gun pits. The attackers moved easily through the French front and then were led onward by a rolling barrage, which soon was well ahead of the infantry because they were held up by the points of resistance. When they encountered the French mainline they were ordered to rest, regroup and wait until their field guns were moved into range. They attacked the main line at 08:30 the following morning, an hour after they had originally scheduled to attack. They were stopped by accurate fire by the bulk of the French artillery. They tried again at noon, but failed. A French counter-attack gained little ground, but convinced the German commanders that they could not prevail. The Fourth Army was now able to send reinforcements to their neighbors to the west who had not fared as well.

In the west on the opening day of the offensive the defenders of the south bank of the Marne had to hold the river bank by enduring an intense three hour bombardment, including many gas shells. Under this cover stormtroopers swarmed across the river in every sort of transport – including 30-man canvas boats and rafts. They began to erect skeleton bridges at 12 points under fire from the Allied survivors. Some Allied units, particularly Colonel Ulysses G. McAlexander's 38th Infantry Regiment of the American 3rd Infantry Division, the "Rock of the Marne", held fast or even counterattacked, but by evening, the Germans had captured a bridgehead on either side of Dormans 4 mi (6.4 km) deep and 9 mi (14 km) wide, despite the aerial intervention of 225 French bombers, dropping 44 short tons (40 t) of bombs on the makeshift bridges. Ludendorff regarded their advance as "the very pinnacle of military victory".

The French were reinforced by the British XXII Corps and 85,000 American troops and the German advance stalled on 17 July 1918.

== Allied counter-offensive ==
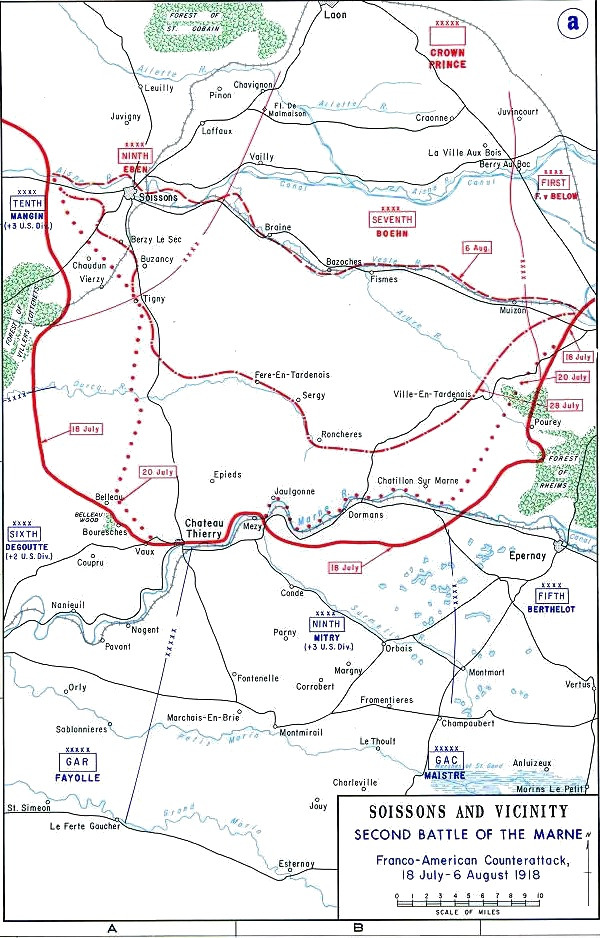
The Allied counter-offensive.

The German failure to break through, or to destroy the Allied armies in the field, allowed Ferdinand Foch, the Allied Supreme Commander, to proceed with the planned major counteroffensive on 18 July; 24 French divisions, including the American 92nd and 93rd Infantry Divisions under French command, joined by other Allied troops, including eight large American divisions under American command and 350 tanks attacked the recently formed German salient.

The Allied preparation was very important in countering the German offensive. It was believed that the Allies had the complete picture of the German offensive in terms of intentions and capabilities. The Allies knew the key points of the German plan down to the minute. There is a legend, possibly true, that engineer Cpt. Hunter Grant, along with the help of engagement coordinator and engineer Cpt. Page, devised a deceptive ruse. A briefcase with false plans for an American countererattack was handcuffed to a man who had died of pneumonia and placed in a vehicle which appeared to have run off the road at a German-controlled bridge. The Germans, on finding and being taken in by these plans, then adjusted their attack to thwart the false Allied plan. Consequently, the French and American forces led by Foch were able to conduct a different attack on exposed parts of the enemy lines, leaving the Germans with no choice but to retreat. This engagement marked the beginning of a German withdrawal that was never effectively reversed. In September nine American divisions (about 243,000 men) joined four French divisions to push the Germans from the St. Mihiel salient.

Earlier, in May, Foch had spotted flaws in the German offensives. The force that defeated the German offensive was mainly French, with American, British and Italian support. Co-ordinating this counter-attack would be a major problem as Foch had to work with "four national commanders but without any real authority to issue order under his own name ... they would have to fight as a combined force and to overcome the major problems of different languages, cultures, doctrines and fighting styles." However, the presence of fresh American troops, unbroken by years of war, significantly bolstered Allied resistance to the German offensive. Floyd Gibbons wrote about the American troops, saying, "I never saw men charge to their death with finer spirit."

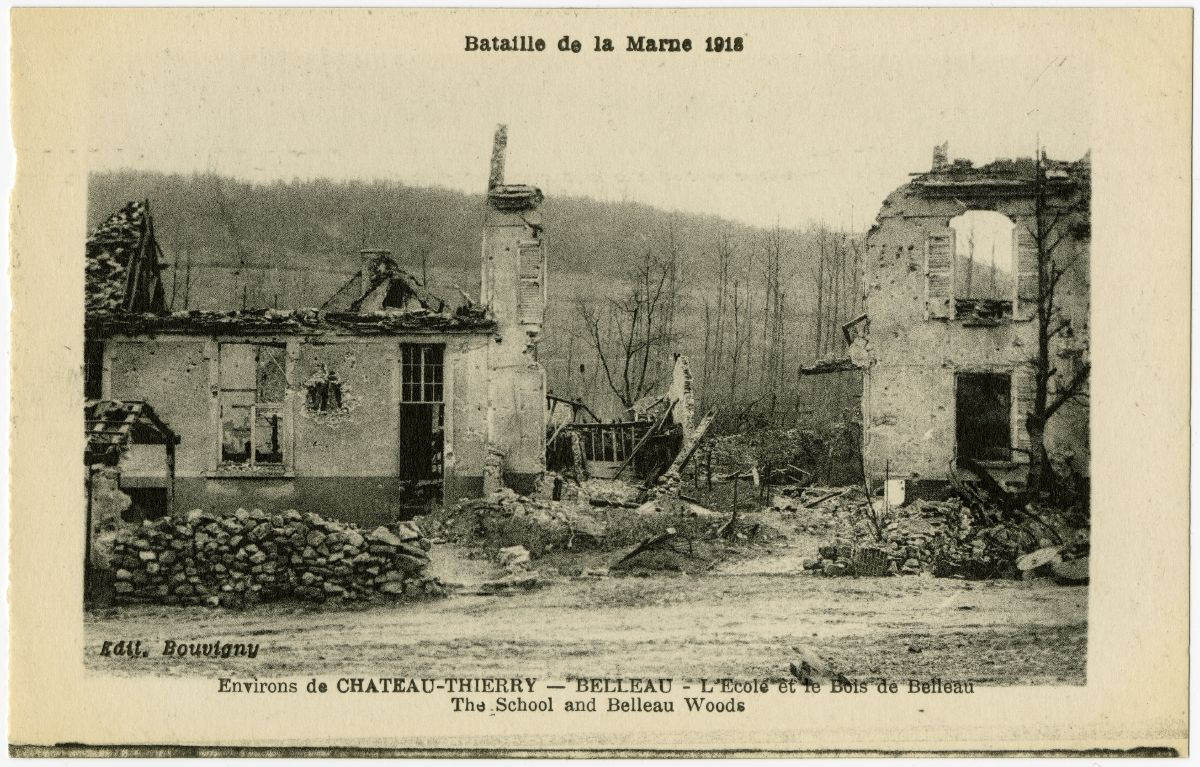
Postcard showing the ruins of the village of Chateau-Thierry in 1918.

On 19 July, the Italian Corps lost 9,334 officers and men out of a total fighting strength of about 24,000 during a German assault on their positions, successfully stopping the German advance. Henri Mathias Berthelot rushed two newly arrived British infantry divisions, the 51st (Highland) and 62nd (West Riding), alongside the Italians straight into attack down the Ardre Valley (the Battle of Tardenois (French: Bataille du Tardenois) – named after the surrounding Tardenois plain).

The Germans ordered a retreat on 20 July and were forced back to the positions from which they had started their Spring Offensive. They strengthened their flank positions opposite the Allied pincers and on the 22nd, Ludendorff ordered to take up a line from the upper Ourcq to Marfaux.

Costly Allied assaults continued for minimal gains. By 27 July, the Germans had withdrawn their center behind Fère-en-Tardenois and had completed an alternative rail link. The Germans retained Soissons in the west.

On 1 August, French and British divisions of General Charles Mangin's Tenth Army renewed the attack, advancing to a depth of nearly 5 miles (8.0 km). The Allied counterattack petered out on 6 August in the face of German offensives. By this stage, the salient had been reduced and the Germans had been forced back to a line running along the Aisne and Vesle Rivers; the front had been shortened by 28 miles (45 km).

== Assessment ==
The Second Battle of the Marne was an important victory. Ferdinand Foch received the baton of a Marshal of France. The Allies had taken 29,367 prisoners, 793 guns and 3,000 machine guns and inflicted 168,000 casualties on the Germans. The primary importance of the battle was its morale aspect – the strategic gains on the Marne marked the end of a string of German victories and the beginning of a series of Allied victories that would in three months end the war.

== See also ==
- First Battle of the Marne
- Memorial to the Second Battle of the Marne at the Butte de Chalmont
- Russian Expeditionary Force in France
