= Battle of La Malmaison =

Final French action of the 1917 campaign of the First World War

- Part of the Nivelle Offensive on the Western Front in the First World War
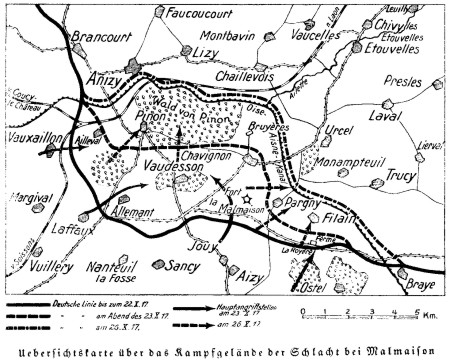
- La Malmaison and the Laffaux Salient, October 1917
Date	23–27 October 1917
Location	France 49°28′17″N 03°29′10″E
Result	French victory

Belligerents
France	German Empire

Commanders and leaders
(French Third Republic) Paul Maistre	(German Empire) Max von Boehn

Strength
6th Army (XI Corps; XIV Corps; XXI Corps); 7 divisions 1,845 guns 64 tanks	7th Army

Casualties and losses
12,000–14,000	18,000–50,000
- La Malmaison, a commune in the Aisne department, northern France

The Battle of La Malmaison (Bataille de la Malmaison) from 23 to 27 October, was the final French action of the 1917 campaign in the First World War, which had begun with the Nivelle Offensive. The French captured the village and fort of La Malmaison and took control of the Chemin des Dames ridge. The German 7th Army (General Max von Boehn) had discovered French preparations for the attack and also identified the date and time. Boehn chose to defend the front positions, rather than treat them as an advanced zone and to conduct the main defence north of the Oise–Aisne Canal. The German artillery was outnumbered three-to-one and on the front of the 14th Division, 32 German batteries were confronted by 125 French, which silenced most of the German guns before the attack. Gas from French bombardments on low-lying land near the Oise–Aisne Canal in the Ailette valley, became so dense that it was impossible to carry ammunition and supplies forward or to remove the wounded.

Battalions from specialist German counter-attack divisions (Eingreifdivisionen) had been distributed along the front line and were caught in the French bombardments, German infantry shelters having been identified by French air reconnaissance and systematically destroyed. After the four-day bombardment was extended by two more days because of bad weather, the French XIV, XXI and XI corps of the Sixth Army, attacked on a 12.1 km (7.5 mi) front with six divisions. (Note: Much of the narrative is derived from the translation of a French original, in which the French custom of describing events from left to right was observed.) Zero hour had been set for 5:45 a.m. but a German message, ordering the front garrisons to be ready at 5:30 a.m. was intercepted and the French start time was moved forward to 5:15 a.m.

The French infantry advanced behind an elaborate creeping barrage but the earlier zero hour meant that the attack began in the dark. Rain began to fall at 6:00 a.m. and the 63 attached Schneider CA1 and Saint-Chamond tanks were impeded by mud and 27 bogged behind the French front line. Fifteen tanks were immobilised crossing no man's land or in the German front line but the 21 remaining tanks and the infantry reached the German second position according to plan. The 38th Division captured Fort de Malmaison and XXI Corps took Allemant and Vaudesson. From 24 to 25 October, XXI and XIV corps advanced rapidly; the I Cavalry Corps was brought forward into the XIV Corps area, ready to exploit a German collapse. The German 7th Army conducted the Bunzelwitz Bewegung (Bunzelwitz Manoeuvre), a retirement from the Chemin-des-Dames to the north bank of the Ailette on the night of 1/2 November.

== Background ==
=== Strategic developments ===
==== Nivelle Offensive ====
General Robert Nivelle replaced Joseph Joffre as French Commander-in-Chief in December 1916, after the costly fighting at Verdun and the Somme. Nivelle claimed that a massive barrage on German lines could bring French victory in 48 hours and avoid the costly battles of attrition, grignotage (nibbling) fought in 1916. The French offensive began on 16 April 1917, after support from the France Prime Minister, despite the doubts of other politicians, Pétain, Micheler, other senior army commanders and the British. The Nivelle offensive involved c. 1.2 million French and British troops and 7,000 artillery pieces on fronts between Reims and Roye, after preliminary offensives at Arras and St. Quentin. The principal effort was an attack on the German positions along the Chemin des Dames ridge, in the Second Battle of the Aisne to rupture the German defences in 48 hours, bring about a battle of manoeuvre and defeat decisively the German armies in France.

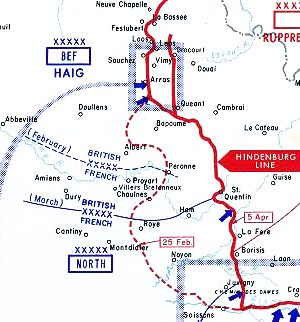
German withdrawal from the Bapaume and Noyon Salients.

From February–March 1917, the German armies in the Noyon and Bapaume salients retired to a new line of fortifications, the Siegfriedstellung (Hindenburg Line) across the base of the salients, from Neuville Vitasse near Arras, through St. Quentin and Laon to the Aisne east of Soissons, ending at Cerny en Laonnois on the Chemin-des-Dames ridge, although the withdrawal to the last part of the line did not take place. The new fortifications were intended to be precautionary, (Sicherheitskoeffizient) built to be used as rallying-positions Eventual-Stellungen (similar to ones built on the Russian front) to shorten the Western Front, economise on troops and create reserves. The Siegfriedstellung had the potential to release the greatest number of troops and construction began on 27 September 1916.

The French Third Army began the offensive against German observation points at St. Quentin from 1 to 13 April, which took some of the German defences in front of the Siegfriedstellung. On 9 April, the British Third Army began the Battle of Arras from Croisilles to Ecurie, against Observation Ridge, north of the Arras–Cambrai road and towards Feuchy and the German second and third lines. The British attack either side of the Scarpe river penetrated 6,000 yd (3.4 mi; 5.5 km), the furthest advance achieved since the beginning of trench warfare. Most of the objectives were reached by the evening of 10 April, except for the line between Wancourt and Feuchy around Neuville-Vitasse. The First Army attacked from Ecurie north of the Scarpe to Vimy Ridge, which fell at about 1:00 p.m., in a 4,000 yd (2.3 mi; 3.7 km) advance. By 16 May, the British had captured 254 German guns but had not broken through.

==== Second Battle of the Aisne ====
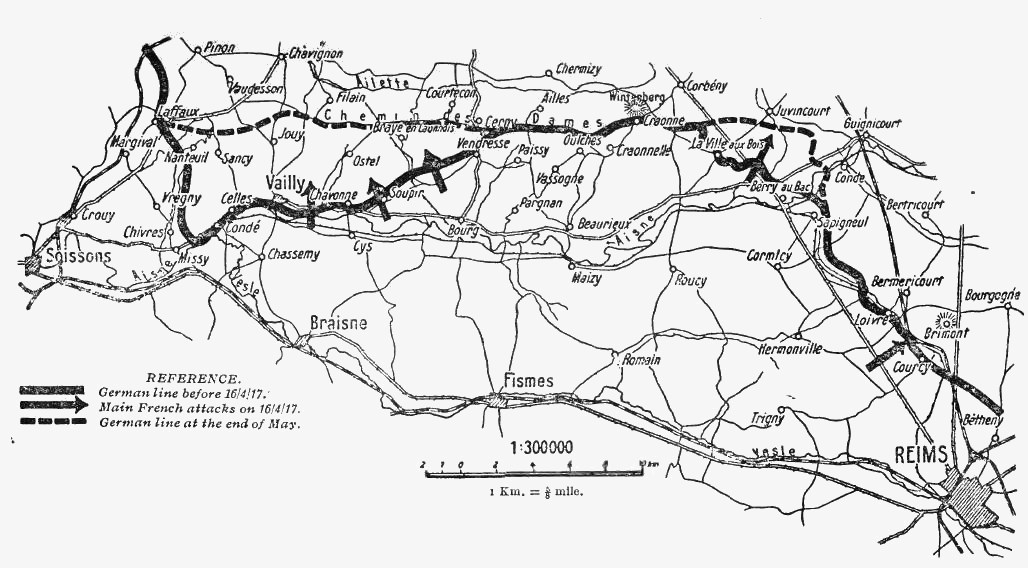
French territorial gains on the Aisne, Nivelle Offensive, April–May 1917

In the Second Battle of the Aisne (16 April – 9 May), the French failed to achieve their strategic objective of a breakthrough and a return to a war of movement but captured tactically important ground and inflicted many casualties on the German defenders. The Germans were forced to retire from the area between Braye-en-Laonnois, Condé-sur-Aisne and Laffaux to the Hindenburg Line from Laffaux Mill, along the Chemin-des-Dames to Courtecon. The German armies in France were still short of reserves, despite the retirements to the Hindenburg Line in March and suffered 163,000 casualties during the Nivelle Offensive. Because of the shortage of troops, the front-holding divisions had to change places with the Eingreif divisions, rather than be withdrawn to recuperate. In a lull from 9 May to 20 August, more German divisions were depleted than at Verdun the previous year. Of the German divisions engaged on the ridge, none spent more than twelve days in the line and only the 46th Reserve Division returned for another period in the line; the French took 8,552 prisoners.

=== Tactical developments ===
==== Battle of the Observatories, May–October ====
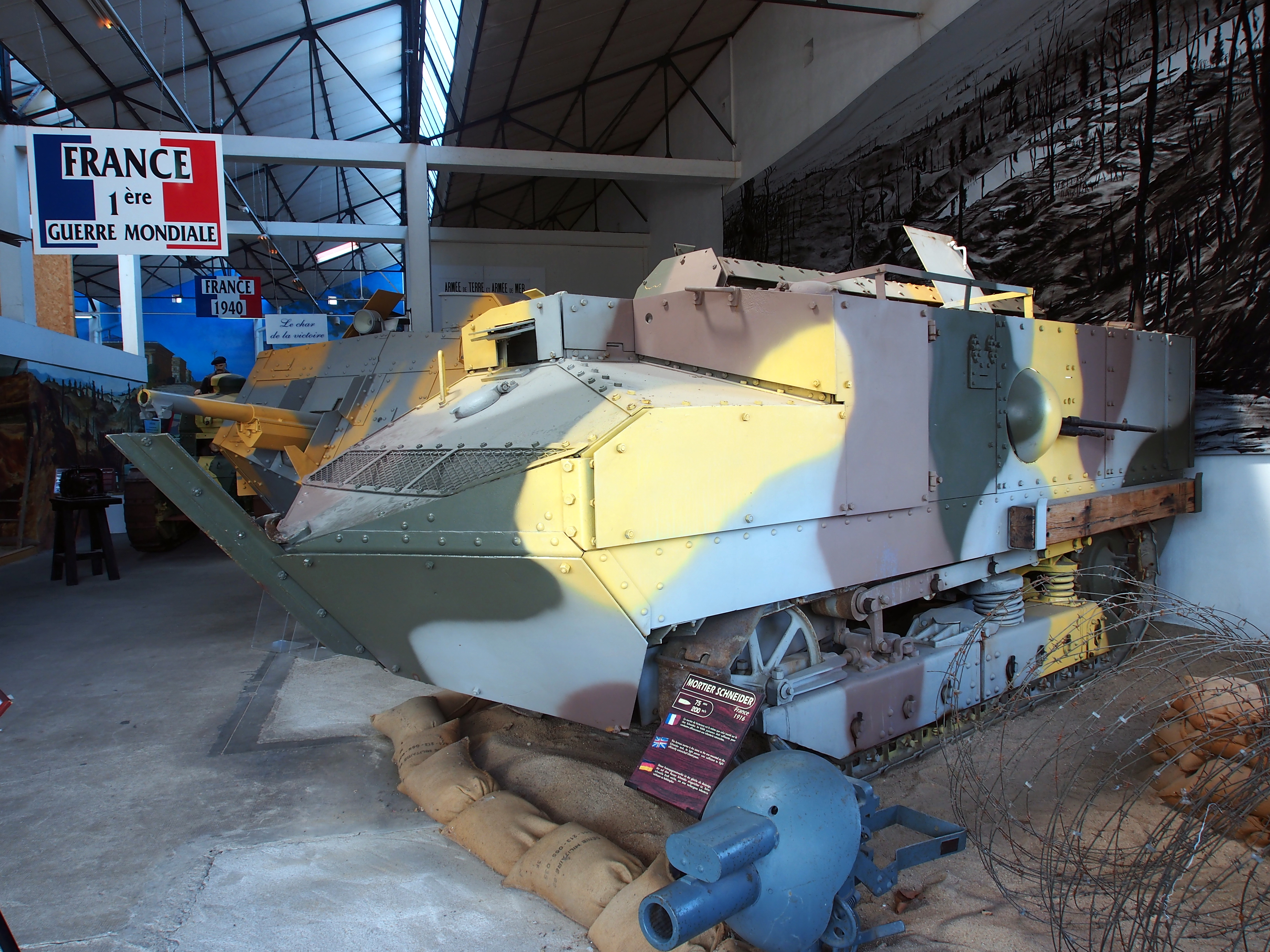
1916 Schneider CA 16, Tank (Musée des Blindés, France, pic-4)

From May there were many local actions on the Chemin-des-Dames ridge. On 23 May, a German assault on the Vauclerc Plateau was defeated and on 24 May, a second attack was driven back in confusion. During the night, the French took the wood south-east of Chevreux and almost annihilated two German battalions. On 25 May, three German columns attacked a salient north-west of Bray-en-Laonnois and gained a footing in the French first trench, before being forced out by a counter-attack. On 26 May, German attacks on salients east and west of Cerny were repulsed and from 26 to 27 May, German attacks between Vauxaillon and Laffaux Mill were defeated. Two attacks on 28 May at Hurtebise, were stopped by French artillery and on the night of 31 May/1 June, German attacks west of Cerny also failed. On the morning of 1 June, after an extensive bombardment, German troops took some trenches north of Laffaux Mill and were then pushed out by a counter-attack in the afternoon.

On 2 June, a bigger German attack began, after an intensive bombardment of the French front, from the north of Laffaux to the east of Berry-au-Bac. On the night of 2/3 June, two German divisions made five attacks on the east, west and central parts of the Californie Plateau and the west end of the Vauclerc Plateau. The Germans attacked in waves, sometimes advancing shoulder-to-shoulder, supported by flame-thrower detachments. Some ground was gained on the Vauclerc Plateau, until French counter-attacks recovered the ground. Despite the French holding improvised defences and the huge volume of German artillery-fire used to prepare attacks, the German methodical counter-attacks (Gegenangriffe) met with little success and at Chevreux north-east of Craonne, the French advanced further into the Laon Plain.

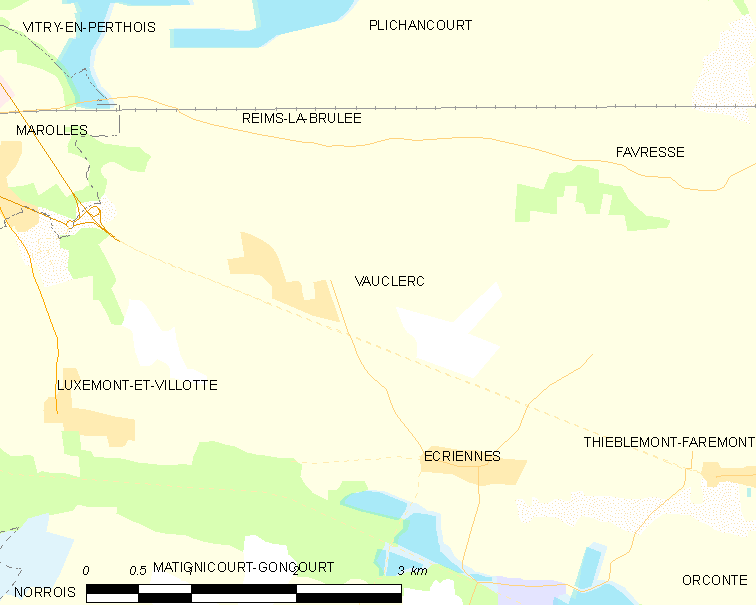
Map of Vauclerc (commune FR insee code 51598)

On the night of 26/27 August, German artillery conducted a preliminary bombardment for an attack early on 27 August, west of the Soissons–Laon road, from Moisy Farm to the south-east of Vauxaillon and Laffaux. East of the road, the French defences on either side of Cerny and on both sides of the Hurtebise Monument, were attacked; near Laffaux the Germans recovered some ground. By 30 August, the strength of each company of the German battalion holding the captured ground had been reduced to 40–50 men. A fresh battalion which relieved it after dark was bombarded by the French artillery throughout the night of the 30/31 August and during the rest of 31 August. At 7:00 p.m., two battalions of French infantry and a battalion of Chasseurs advanced behind a creeping barrage and a shrapnel bombardment, with double barrages along each flank. A squadron of aeroplanes machine-gunned the German infantry and the crews of trench mortars and batteries beyond the crest. In fifteen minutes, the French attack recaptured the ground, except on the right flank, where the crew of a machine-gun post resisted until the morning.

Three German counter-attacks in the night were costly failures and about 200 prisoners were captured by the French, along with seven machine-guns; on the night of 1/2 September, two more German counter-attacks failed. On 31 August, a French party north-east of Craonne, wrecked 180 m (200 yd) of German trench south-east of Corbeny and returned with twelve prisoners. On the same day, a German raid to the south-east of Vauxaillon was repulsed, as was one in the Cerny region during the night of 1/2 September. Four attacks on the Hurtebise Spur were made on 3 September, by three waves of German infantry which failed to penetrate the French covering barrage. Simultaneous attempts were made to advance on the Ailles Plateau to the west of the spur and to the east, on the evening of 4 September and morning of 5 September. Attacks were made on the Casemates and on the Californie Plateau above Craonne, which were repulsed by French artillery and machine-gun barrages.

For most of September, artillery duels and raids by both sides took place from Vauxaillon to Craonne. Long-range guns bombarded villages and châteaux far behind the front line, directed by observers in lines of observation balloons, which were protected by aircraft and many anti-aircraft guns. From 20 to 21 September, a German attack south of the Arbre de Cerny and at the neck joining the Casemates to the Californie Plateau failed and on the night of 12/13 October, Thuringian stormtroops attacked between the western edge of the Hurtebise Finger and the French positions in the plain east of Craonne. North of Vauclerc Mill, the Germans captured the French first line but were pushed back by a counter-attack; German detachments probing between the Hurtebise Spur and the south of La Royère were also repulsed. On 17 October, the French preliminary bombardment for the offensive at La Malmaison began and the next day the German communiqué read

North-east of Soissons the lively fighting activity, which has lasted for days past, developed to an artillery battle, which, since early yesterday, has continued with only short intervals from the Ailette region as far as Braye. The batteries of the neighbouring sectors also took part in the duel.

— German communiqué

and during 18 October, French detachments patrolled between Vauxaillon and Braye-en-Laonnois, destroyed several strong points and returned with 100 prisoners from four German divisions. Until the beginning of the battle, the artillery of both sides fired constantly, with much trench-mortar fire by the French, which a German report of 20 October, reported had transformed the foremost fighting zone between Vauxaillon and Braye into a crater field. Since the Chemin-des-Dames ridge was honeycombed with large limestone caves and quarries, adequate artillery preparation was indispensable. (Note: For centuries stone-cutters had tunnelled into the ridge; the sides and summits of the plateaux were studded with workings, often 9.1–12.2 m (30–40 ft) underground and many, like the Dragon's Cave beneath the Hurtebise Finger, were connected to the surface by tunnels. Some of the workings were held by the French, in which the assaulting troops could be kept under cover until the last moment but most of the underground chambers and tunnels from the Ailette, north of Vauxaillon, to the Chevrégny Spur on the Chemin-des-Dames ridge, were still held by the Germans.)

==== Fortifications ====
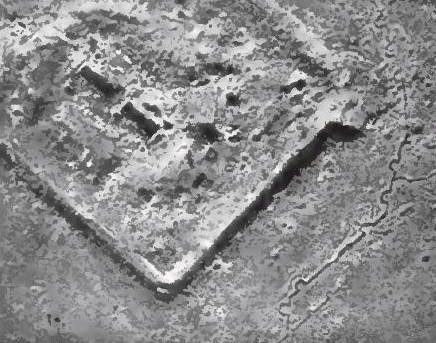
Fort de la Malmaison, 1917

Fort de la Malmaison lay on the Chemin-des-Dames ridge and had been built as part of an entrenched camp north of the Aisne, in the Séré de Rivières system, designed by General Raymond Adolphe Séré de Rivières and built from the 1870s. The fort was in the northern angle between the Chemin-des-Dames and the Soissons–Laon road. The fortress casemates were tested with high explosives in 1887 and found to be insufficiently robust. Steel reinforced concrete had been added but in 1913, the fort was sold to a Laon contractor, to demolish and use the materials to build new barracks in town. A long tunnel, the Montparnasse Quarry lay on the northern slopes below the fort, on the route to Chavignon village at the foot of the ridge. The quarry was big enough to shelter an infantry brigade. The fort was to the north-west of the quarry, on the summit of the plateau at the western end of the ridge and the dismantled work was surrounded by a moat filled with mud. The subterranean galleries had been rebuilt and garrisoned by the Germans in September 1914, the outworks and interior being provided with several ferro-concrete machine-gun nests.

From the ramparts, the Germans could see all movement from the Ailette to the Aisne and on the spurs running down to the Aisne from the Chemin-des-Dames ridge. There was a clear view northwards from the fort over the Ailette, along the lower edge of the west side of the Forest of Coucy and past the village of Brancourt; to the east were two groups of hills round Anizy, on the north bank of the Ailette. Laon was about 13 km (8 mi) distant and visible at the end of the valley of the Ardon, which joins the Ailette north of Chavignon. Further east, beyond the Bassin d'alimentation reservoir, was the hilltop village of Monampteuil. East of the reservoir, the valley of the Upper Ailette was visible as far as the Troyon–Laon road. South of Fort de la Malmaison, in the centre of the plateau closer to the French lines, lay the huge Bohery Quarry, where the ground began to slope steeply down towards the Aisne valley. In October 1917, German engineers were still connecting the quarry with the Montparnasse tunnel, other underground works and the galleries under the fort. The Montparnasse, Fort de la Malmaison and Bohery excavations, the Fruty Quarry on the edge of the Soissons–Laon road, about 1.6 km (1 mi) east of Laffaux Mill and many other subterranean obstacles faced the Sixth Army.

== Prelude ==
=== Order of battle ===
On the left flank of the French Sixth Army was XIV Corps (Général François Marjoulet), with the 28th Division, the 27th Division and the 129th Division in reserve. In the centre, XXI Corps (Général Jean Degoutte) prepared to attack with the 13th and 43rd divisions. On the right flank, XI Corps (Général Louis de Maud'huy), had the 38th Division and an attached tank group, the 66th Division and part of the 67th Division (XXXIX Corps) in support. Artillery support was provided by the 2nd, 12th, 32nd, 231st, 240th and 259th artillery regiments with 812 field guns, 768 × 75 mm and 44 × 95 mm, 862 heavy guns from 105–380 mm (4.1–15.0 in), 105 super-heavy guns and 66 trench mortar batteries. The German 7th Army had five divisions in the first position, three Eingreif divisions and three divisions in close reserve, supported by 180 batteries of artillery, 63 of which were heavy.

=== French preparations ===
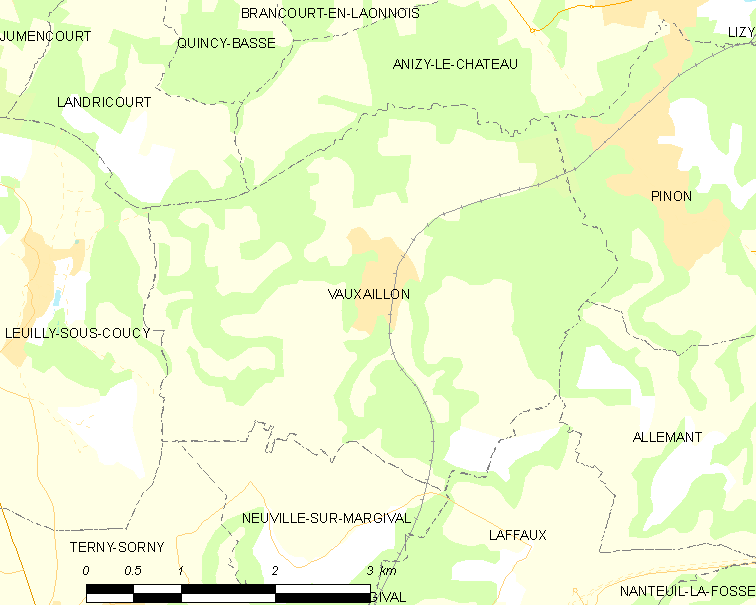
Map of Vauxaillon area (commune FR insee code 02768)

The Sixth Army formed part of groupe d'armées du Nord (GAN, General Franchet d'Esperey). Before the Nivelle Offensive in April, d'Esperey had studied the tactical problems connected with the natural barrier between the Aisne and the plain at Laon and advised Maistre about the topography of the region. The XIV, XXI and XI corps were to conduct the attack, with the 67th Division of XXXIX Corps providing trench garrisons on the heights east of La Royère Farm. French tanks (artillerie d'assault) had been technically improved since 16 April, when they had operated on the plain from Craonne to Berry-au-Bac, despite the steep spurs, cratered ground and the establishment of anti-tank batteries by the Germans.

The tanks were modified to make them less liable to catch fire, pigeons were embarked to carry messages and communication panels operated from inside were installed. Groupement II (three groupes of Schneider tanks with two wireless tanks) to attack strongpoints in stages up to the final objectives, 1.9 mi (3 km) distant and groupement X (two groupes of Saint Chamond tanks and two wireless tanks). Some tanks were attached to XIV Corps, on the west flank of the Sixth Army, astride the Soissons–Laon road. On 5 May, the French had captured Laffaux Mill, Chateau de la Motte, Fruty and Allemant quarries but the Germans had recaptured much of the ground during the Battle of the Observatories.

Super-heavy siege artillery was necessary to pierce the roofs of the caverns on the Chemin-des-Dames and Pétain provided several batteries of 380 mm (15 in) and 410 mm (16 in) guns, which fired non-explosive shells with armour-piercing points, capable of penetrating the roofs of the tunnels. Where the thickness of the roof was too great for one shell, a salvo falling about the same spot gradually reduced the layer of rock, until it was thin enough to be penetrated. The accuracy of French gunnery was exemplary and on 21 October, an observer reported that under direction by an artillery-observation aeroplane, one of the 380 mm (15 in) guns fired five shells consecutively into the same hole. The galleries of Fort de la Malmaison and the interiors of some of the caves were demolished. The roof of the Montparnasse Quarry was made to resemble a honeycomb and despite its extraordinary thickness, at least two 410 mm (16 in) shells penetrated to the double gallery underneath, causing many casualties to the garrison. Holes driven into the overhead cover became funnels, down which flowed gas and shrapnel bullets.

=== German preparations ===
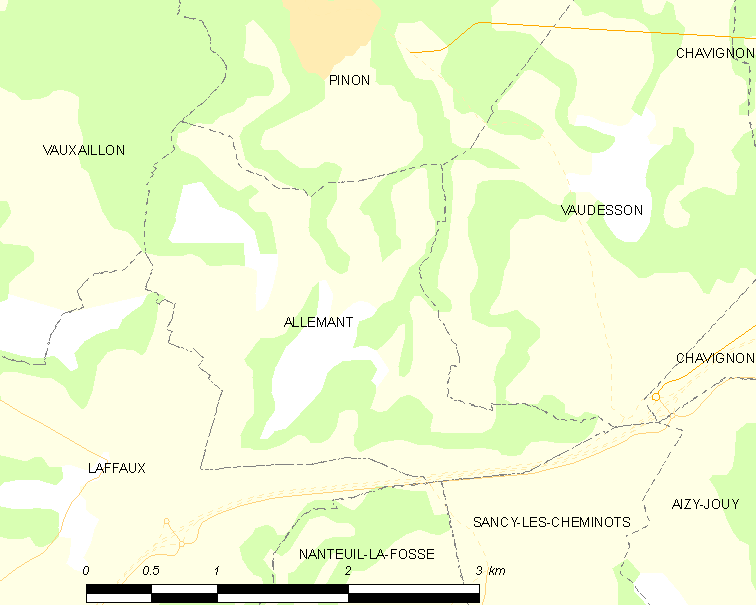
Map of Allemant area (commune FR insee code 02010)

The vulnerability of the Laffaux Corner to envelopment was made worse by the proximity of the Ailette and the parallel Canal de l'Oise a l'Aisne (Oise–Aisne Canal) to the north, below the Chemin des Dames. A retreat to the north of the river and canal would be difficult, despite the number of crossing points, which could be made impassable by artillery-fire, particularly with gas-shell. Much of the German artillery was south of the canal, from Pinon to Pargny and was cramped for space in patches of woodland, so far back that only long-range fire could reach beyond the French front line. Reserve positions in the salient ran north-east and the front position had insufficient depth, as it lay partly on and partly behind the Chemin-des-Dames ridge, which had a convex slope at the top. Ridges radiated down to the Aisne valley, over which the German positions had inadequate observation. Due to a lack of manpower, constant French artillery-fire and the autumn rains, the condition of the German defences was poor and in some places, only narrow trenches and shell-hole positions existed. There were few pillboxes and tunnels but numerous underground quarries, which had been equipped with ventilation and lighting systems, for ammunition and food storage.

Behind the Pinonriegel (Pinon trench) in the south-west corner of the salient near Laffaux, work had begun on a reserve line from Pinon to Vaudesson and on rearward defences behind the Canal de l'Oise a l'Aisne for a possible retirement, known as the Gudrun Bewegung (Gudrun Manoeuvre). From 11 October, the right flank division of Group Vailly was relieved by the 13th Division and on the left the 2nd Guard Division was moved into the line near Malmaison. The west face of the salient from the Anizy–Vauxaillon railway line to the canal tunnel, the area considered must vulnerable, was held by Group Crépy, the VIII Reserve Corps headquarters (General Georg Wichura), with the 37th Division and the 14th Division, joined by the 52nd Division from 15 October. In Group Vailly to the east, the ZbV 54 (special duties) headquarters (Lieutenant-General Max von Müller), defended its sector with the 13th Division, 2nd Division, 5th Guards Division and the right flank units of the 47th Reserve Division. The 43rd Reserve Division and the 9th Division, which was intended mainly to support the left flank adjoining Group Liesse, were in reserve as Eingreif divisions.

The ground-holding divisions held a frontage of about 4.8 km (3 mi) each and to evade French artillery-fire, had moved the reserve and resting battalions far to the rear; about 18 battalions of the Eingreif divisions positioned near the Ailette, were moved closer to the front to compensate. Another 36 artillery batteries were brought into the area, which increased the number of guns to c. 580, of which 225 were heavy and super-heavy but this did little to compensate for the vast French numerical superiority in guns. About 220 artillery pieces, particularly those behind the 14th and 13th divisions and some of those behind the 2nd Guard Division, south of the canal were difficult to supply and the new batteries were placed north of the Ailette.

On 15 September, the 7th Army had c. 168 aircraft against 300 French but the Army Group headquarters delayed the dispatch of more air units until mid-October, having expected attacks elsewhere and had also reinforced the Flanders front. Many of the new air units arrived after the French preliminary bombardment had begun and when the French infantry attack came, were still unfamiliar with the terrain. By late October, the 7th Army had received 17 squadrons, including four fighter units, which increased the number of aircraft to more than 200, along with support available from the fighter squadrons of the neighbouring 2nd and 1st armies.

Caves and tunnels had been used by the Germans as shelters for reserves, to reinforce the trench garrisons in the network of trenches running from the Ailette valley, over the Soissons–Laon railway, up the western slopes of the Mont des Singes, east of Vauxaillon and along the summit of the plateau above Laffaux, to the Laffaux Mill on the Laon–Soissons road. There the German trenches ran eastwards below the Fruty Quarry, crossed the road and ascended to the southern edge of the Malmaison plateau at Mennejean Farm. From the farm, the front line went north-eastwards to a point 910 m (1,000 yd) south of La Malmaison Farm, due west of the fort and to the right of the Soissons–Laon road. The line wound along the summit of the Malmaison Plateau to the Chevrégny Spur above the Canal de l'Oise à l'Aisne. West of the Chevrégny Spur the villages, except for Allemant, lay on lower ground between five spurs facing north. Froidmont Farm and the plateau north of the Chevrégny Spur and further east, on the Chemin-des-Dames ridge, along with several posts on the northern edge of the plateau, together with the villages of Courtecon, Cerny and Ailles on the northern slope, north-east of Craonne and the plain; Chevreux were also fortified.

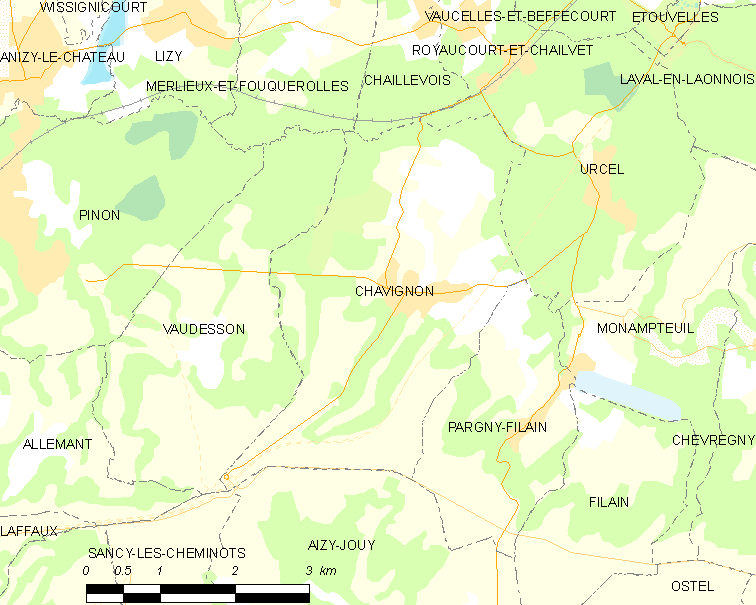
Map of the Chavignon area (commune FR insee code 02174)

The ground down to the forests of Pinon and Rosay, which covered most of the uneven plain south of the marshes around the Ailette, comprised numerous ravines which in places were still wooded. The sides of the ravines wound around, facing all directions and could not be swept from end to end by artillery-fire. On the western flank, the Vauxaillon valley ran along most of the western and eastern slopes of the ridge and plateau above Laffaux. The Mont des Singes Spur was to its east and the Vauxaillon valley, which narrowed to the Allemant ravine, went round and then northwards, joining a ravine which curved round the Allemant plateau west of Pinon. The Allemant plateau was cut from south to north by the narrow St. Guillain ravine and other ravines lay below the crest of the Chemin-des-Dames ridge. From Vaudesson a ravine descended northwards to the west of Chavignon, where it met the western of two gullies, at the head of which was Malmaison Farm; Fort de la Malmaison was on the plateau above the eastern gully. The plateau was separated from the Filain and Pargny-Filain area, on the east of the French attack front, by a valley into which the eastern or Bois de la Garenne gully opened, just south of Chavignon.

German engineers had exploited the irregular ground, which was easy to defend with machine-guns. The German front line on the crest of the Chemin-des-Dames and Laffaux ridges consisted of two or more trenches. Behind the forward zone, from the western edge of the ridge above Pinon, a Riegelstellung (support line) ran eastwards, south of the farm and Fort Malmaison to the Panthéon. (Note: A Riegelstellung was a barring position, intended to stop retreat from the line in front.) To the north of the Riegelstellung, the fortified villages of Pinon and Vaudesson, Malmaison Farm, the fort and below them, the Montparnasse quarry, Chavignon and Bruyère, with various intermediate fortified woods, caves and pillboxes, formed the German third position. The village fortress of Allemant and other strongpoints lay between the first and second positions. On the German right flank north of Moisy Farm entrenchments, round Mont des Singes to the bank of the Ailette, prevented an attacker from outflanking the heights in that direction. Low ground north of the Pinon–Chavignon road as far as the Ailette was dominated by the forests of Pinon and Rosay, where many trees still stood.

The Canal de l'Oise à l'Aisne (a summit level canal), had been drained and was not a serious obstacle; behind the German east flank, beyond the Panthéon, were the fortified villages of Pargny-Filain and Filain, the southern sides of which were protected by earthworks. Should they and Chavignon be lost, it was unlikely that the Germans could remain on the southern slopes of the Chemin-des-Dames east of the Chevrégny Spur. Attacked from the front and flanks, the Germans would have to retire behind the Ailette, where a French pursuit up the valley of the Ardou to Laon could be enfiladed by German artillery on the Anizy hills and in the Forest of Coucy. Guns on the Monampteuil heights enfiladed the mouth of the corridor and at the northern end, there was German artillery around the Laon hill. A rapid exploitation up the valley was impossible, because the ground on the borders of the canal was marshy. (Note: A writer in the Vossische Zeitung of 20 August, had claimed that a French attack had no chance of success. Müller had ordered an attack at the Chevrégny Spur, to begin at 5:30 a.m. on 23 October, fifteen minutes after the French advance had begun.)

Group Vailly, had four divisions between Moisy and La Royère farms and three on the northern slopes of the heights. Three divisions were in reserve, the 5th Guards Division around Filain and Pargny-Filain, the 2nd Guards Division on the right supported the 13th Division and the 43rd Reserve Division held the ground between Malmaison and La Royère farms. During the battle, Müller was reinforced by the 6th Division from Galicia and by elements of four other divisions. Müller had taken precautions against a retreat and French air reconnaissance reported that fruit trees and farms in the Ailette valley were being destroyed and artillery was being moved to the high ground about Monampteuil, to enfilade the French if they took the west end of the Chemin-des-Dames ridge and descended towards the Ailette.

=== French plan ===
On 23 October at 5:45 a.m., the French infantry were to advance between the Anizy–Vauxaillon railway and Royère on a 10 km (6.2 mi) front, to the northern edge of the ridge on which lay the villages of Pinon, Chavignon, Pargny and Filain, in three stages. After a pause for consolidation, the attack was to continue to the Ailette on 25 October. The main effort was intended to drive a salient into the German defences, on a line from Vaurains to Fort Malmaison and Chavignon. Behind the six attacking divisions and two regiments of the flanking divisions, six more divisions waited to nettoyer (clean up) and consolidate the captured ground. The French attack was faced by 31/2 front holding divisions, backed by two depleted Eingreif divisions, since part of the 9th Division remained with Group Liesse further east.

XIV Corps was to capture the German first position, from Moisy Farm to Laffaux Mill, Mennejean Farm and the Fruty Quarry, by taking the ridge above Laffaux, from Moisy Farm to a neck of ground linking it to the Malmaison plateau. The corps was then to keep on the right of the ravines, between which lies the Mont des Singes spur and capture the strong point of the Guerbette valley, below the tip of the spur and the Château de la Motte. The 28th and 27th divisions were then to descend into the ravine of Allemant, capture the quarry and ruins of Allemant, the Allemant plateau and the strong points between the German first and second positions. After the capture of Allemant, the 28th Division was to halt between Vallée Guerbette and a point 550 m (600 yd) north of Allemant. Pivoting on Allemant, the 27th Division on the right, was to attack the Riegelstellung known there as Giraffe and Lizard trenches. On the extreme right flank the French were to stop on the high ground west of Vaudesson. Assuming success, the Mont des Singes spur would be outflanked to the east and the Malmaison spur to the west.

On 5 May, the French had reached the outskirts of Allemant but failed to capture the network of defences from the south of Mennejean Farm to the south of the Bohery quarry. On 23 October, XXI Corps with the 13th and 43rd divisions, reinforced by several battalions of Chasseurs Alpins, were to drive the German 13th and 43rd divisions and part of the 2nd Guard Division, from the labyrinths on the south-west end of the Malmaison plateau and from Bois des Gobineaux, on the sides of the ravine between the bois and the Allemant Spur. Having secured both sides of the Soissons–Laon road, from the Fruty Quarry to the point where the Chemin-des-Dames branches off eastwards, the XXI Corps divisions were to attack Malmaison Farm and the Tranchée de la Dame (Lady Trench) between the farm and Fort de la Malmaison.

The flanking divisions of XXI Corps were then to descend on the final objectives, Vaudesson village, Bois de la Belle Croix, Montparnasse Quarry, the west end of Chavignon village and the Bois des Hoinets, a northern continuation of Bois de la Belle Croix. If successful, the centre of the Sixth Army would be in a salient but west of Vaudesson a deep ravine from north of Laffaux Mill to the east of Pinon, commanded from the west by the 27th Division in Giraffe Trench, would protect the left flank of XXI Corps from counter-attacks. On the right flank, in the XI Corps area, the 38th Division would co-operate with the 43rd Division on the right of XXI Corps, to capture the Bohery Quarry, Fort de la Malmaison, Orme Farm on the plateau to the north of the fort, Bois de la Garenne in the ravine to the west, Many Farm east of the Pargny-Filain–Chavignon road, due east of Garenne Wood and the east end of Chavignon village. With the 43rd Division, it was to secure the north end of the Malmaison Plateau, the slopes and the ravines descending from it to Chavignon.

On the right of the 38th Division, the 66th Division and the XXXIX Corps regiment of the 67th Division, extended the attack front east to the Chevrégny spur, to force 5th Guard Division out of the ruins of Panthéon Farm, Panthéon Quarry and Orage Quarry. The objectives were the east end of the Malmaison plateau and two lines of trenches further back; Fanion Trench to the north, the east end of the German second position and Lützen Trench just below the crest towards Pargny-Filian. The Chasseurs Alpins and the 67th Division, were to attack part of the neck joining the Malmaison plateau to the Chevrégny Spur, reach the Les Bovettes water-tower and then work down the ravine on the east side of the north of the Malmaison plateau and down the Bovettes ravine to Pargny-Filain, to capture Lützen Trench, Pargny-Filain village and Bois de Veau, in the depression between Fort de la Malmaison and Pargny-Filain. During the advance, the French would have to pass the subterranean quarries near Les Bovettes, the Tonnerre Quarry and across the crest, where the French could be engaged by the German artillery on the Monampteuil Heights.

=== Preparatory bombardment ===
A French artillery demonstration was conducted against Group Crépy, on the western face of the salient from 6–7 October in support of British operations in Flanders and on 11 October highly accurate French artillery registration commenced. The weather on 17 October was clear and French aircraft made a coordinated attack on German observation balloons. The main bombardment by c. 1,790 guns began, with an average of 180 guns for each 1 km (0.62 mi) of front, three times the amount of German artillery. Along with the usual destructive bombardment, the Ailette valley was deluged with gas shells. The German counter-bombardment could only be maintained in the eastern part of the attack front and French patrols found that some German outposts had been left unoccupied.

The German artillery reply began with a substantial counter-bombardment but this rapidly diminished, especially south of the Ailette, where the supply of ammunition and equipment was blocked by the thick gas cloud in the valley. Some guns were withdrawn but on 19 October, the gas cloud was so thickened by fog that it became impossible to move the rest. Positions held by the 14th Division in Group Crépy and those of the 13th Division and 2nd Guard Division in Group Vailly were quickly reduced to crater-fields. French aircrew watched fortifications and tunnel-openings for signs of occupancy and immediately directed artillery-fire on any which were seen. The French bombardment had most effect at the boundary of the 13th Division and 2nd Guard Division, where by the night of 21 October, a gap 800 m (870 yd) wide had been blown in the German defences, which could not be repaired. On the eastern flank of the attack front, the bombardment of the 5th Guard Division was less damaging but a local attack, Operation Autumn Harvest was cancelled.

Ceaseless explosions and concussion from shell bursts at the mouths of caverns caused rock falls and spread thick clouds of dust. The garrisons changed position but rarely found a spot not under bombardment. A feeling of impotence spread among the defenders and was made worse when the German artillery was silenced. French artillery barrages on the roads from Laon across the Ailette to the Chemin-des-Dames, made it impossible for ammunition to be carried forward. Even long-range 200 mm (8 in) naval guns near Pinon, were later found to be without ammunition. Morale among the German infantry of the cave garrisons was also depressed by isolation and the unprecedented gas shell bombardment, which forced them permanently to wear masks. Supply routes were closed by curtains of shrapnel fire and from 20–23 October, the Ailette valley and the sides and summits of the spurs projecting into it from the ridge were blanketed by gas, which made it impossible for German gunners to remove their gas masks to eat and drink.

== Battle ==
=== Sixth Army, 23 October ===
==== XIV Corps ====
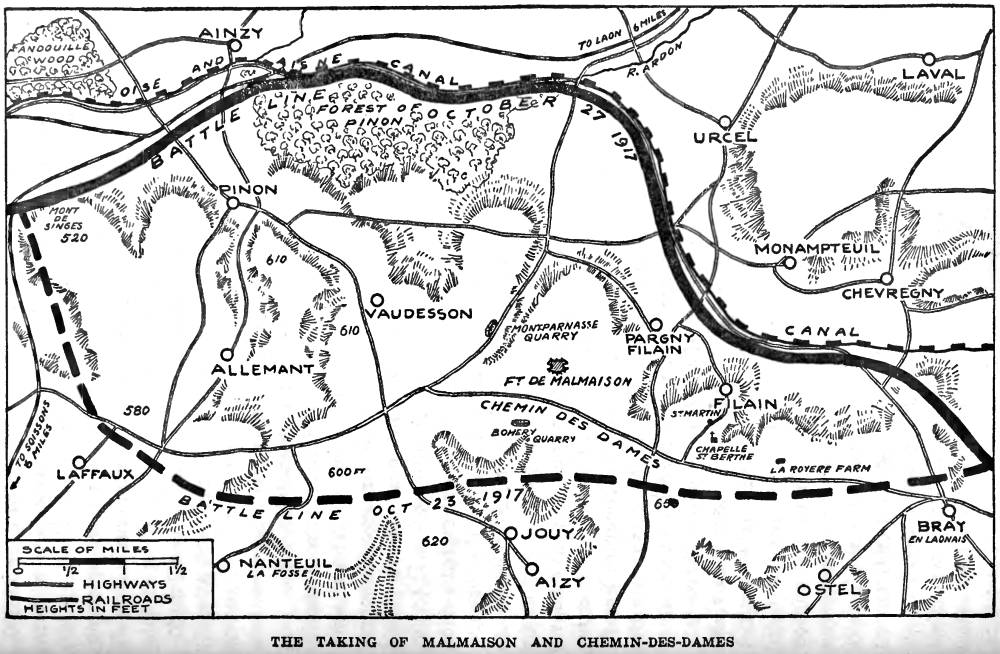
The battle of La Malmaison

At 5:15 a.m., the French field artillery began a creeping barrage and German SOS rockets rose into the air and the German artillery managed to fire a prompt but thin counter-barrage. The French infantry of XIV Corps on the left and the XXI Corps in the centre, moved up the slopes and ravines towards their objectives, against the faces of the obtuse angle formed by the Laffaux Salient. XI Corps and the regiment of the 67th Division of XXXIX Corps on the right began a parallel advance. Until XXI Corps reached the Chemin-des-Dames, XI Corps was isolated on its left flank; the attacks of XIV and XXI corps had reciprocal effects. The deep, steep Laffaux–Pinon ravine between Mont des Singes and the Allermant plateau, increased the difficulties of the German defenders in the salient. The garrisons to the south fought with their backs to the ravine and the German troops in the trenches and pillboxes of the western face, risked being cut off and pushed eastwards into the ravine, if they failed to escape down the Allemant gorge to Pinon or retreat to the Mont des Singes spur.

On the left of XIV Corps, the 28th Division quickly defeated the Germans in Moisy Farm and the Laffaux Mill at the tip of the salient; then took the intermediate trenches and pillboxes on the summit of Laffaux ridge. A defensive flank was established from Moisy Farm across the plateau, to prevent a counter-attack from the Mont des Singes. On the right flank, from Laffaux Mill to Mennejean Farm, the 27th Division and XXI Corps to the east of the farm, attacked the southern face of the salient. Mennejean Farm and the first line trenches fell quickly and Fruty Quarry was surrounded by battalions of the 75th Regiment.. The French infantry reached the edge of the Laffaux–Pinon ravine, at the junction with the Allemant ravine, which ran downwards to the west of Pinon. The 28th Division arrived almost simultaneously at the western edge of the Allemant ravine, which forced many German soldiers back into both hollows with many casualties.

In the centre, XXI Corps crossed the Soissons–Laon road, entered the German second position and then captured Malmaison Farm by 6:00 a.m., which secured the right flank of the XIV Corps, since the farm was level with Allemant. With the defenders of Fruty Quarry cut off, at 6:15 a.m. Marjoulet ordered his troops into the ravines, to capture Mont de Laffaux, encircle Allemant and seize the southern end of the Allemant plateau. Mont de Laffaux, south of Allemant, commanded both ravines and was determinedly defended by the garrison against the 75th Regiment, part of which was still besieging Fruty Quarry. Round the Château de la Motte and to the north, at the strong point of Vallée Guerbette, below the east end of the Mont des Singes plateau, there was also a determined defence. Around Allemant, several machine-gun emplacements held up the advance but before 9: a.m., the 30th Regiment worked its way on to the plateau north of Allemant. The 75th Regiment captured Fruty Quarry and took Mont de Laffaux, ready to attack the village from the south, to take the strong points in it systematically.

At Bois de St. Guillain, between Allemant and the Laffaux–Pinon ravine, at 9:15 a.m., the 140th Regiment was stopped by fire from machine-gun nests, until French tanks crawled up and knocked them out. The advance was resumed by the right wing, as the left flank units halted on a line from Vallée Guerbette, to a point 460 m (500 yd) north of Allemant. The attackers on the right, astride the St. Guillain and Laffaux–Pinon ravines, reduced St. Guillain Farm and assaulted the second German position, over-running Giraffe and Lizard trenches by noon in a rainstorm. Except for Bois 160, south of Vaudesson, where the garrison held out until the early hours of 24 October and for some isolated quarries, the German position south of the Riegelstellung and east of the Allemant ravine had fallen. The 27th Division faced Pinon and covered Vaudesson, which had been secured by XXI Corps. XIV Corps had pivoted on its left flank to a line perpendicular with the start line. The Germans on the Mont des Singes and in Pinon with the Ailette at their backs, were menaced from the south and the west. XIV Corps had also taken c. 3,000 prisoners, several guns, machine-guns and trench mortars.

==== XXI Corps ====
XXI Corps attacked the remainder of the southern face of the Laffaux salient, from east of Mennejean Farm to the south of the Bohery Quarry. If the attack failed, XIV Corps on the Allemant plateau would be caught in a salient, as would XI Corps on the right at Fort de la Malmaison. At 5:15 a.m., both divisions advanced up the slopes towards the Soissons–Laon road, from Fruty Quarry to the west of Malmaison Farm. Little opposition was met and the wire entanglements and trenches were found to have been obliterated. Bois des Gobineaux, beyond the road on the south side of the Laffaux–Pinon ravine, was captured by the 21st and 20th Chasseur battalions, Vaurains Farm in the western angle of the Soissons–Laon and Pinon roads, was captured with tank support and the east ends of Lizard Trench and Lady Trench were occupied. At about 6:00 a.m., the 31st Chasseur Battalion stormed Malmaison Farm and at 6:45 a.m., the French were established north of the Riegelstellung.

At 9:15 a.m., the 13th Division began to descend the northern slopes towards Vaudesson and Bois de la Belle Croix. On the right, the 43rd Division attacked downhill on both sides of the Soissons–Laon road, to the Montparnasse Quarry on the left side of the road, level with Vaudesson against the Bois des Hoinets and the west end of Chavignon village. Bois des Hoinets and Chavignon were close to the road from Pinon, which from Chavignon ran up along the eastern slopes of the Malmaison spur to Pargny-Filain. The wood and Chavignon were considerably nearer the Ailette than Vaudesson. The 38th Division also descended the heights and attacked Chavignon. At Zero Hour, the division had ascended the slopes towards Bohery Quarry and Fort de la Malmaison; at the quarry the German garrison fought until overrun and were killed or captured.

The 38th Division ejected the Germans from Lady Trench, halted on the summit of the plateau, in front of Bois de Garenne, north of Chavignon and east of the Montparnasse Quarry. On the right flank, the élite 4th Zouaves had been detailed to take Fort de la Malmaison; from 3:00 a.m. they had been bombarded by German heavy artillery, which caused many casualties. At 5:15 a.m., the advance began and only traces of the first two German trenches were found. At Carbine Trench some resistance was encountered, the Zouaves advanced towards the fort, guided by French artillery firing incendiary shells. From Bois de la Veau on the right, massed machine-gun fire was encountered but the surviving Zouaves, reached the remains of the counterscarp and entered the ruins of the fort.

The garrison was stalked through the ruins and quickly overrun. Bombers and flame-thrower teams searched the galleries, several machine-guns were captured and at 6:05 a.m., the flag of the battalion was hoisted over the fort. Other Zouave battalions on the flanks came up and the 38th Division halted and helped to consolidate the summit of the plateau, which had come under bombardment by German artillery on the Monampteuil Heights to the east. At 9:16 a.m., the divisions of XXI Corps descended the northern slopes towards Vaudesson, Bois de la Belle Croix, Montparnasse Quarry, Bois des Hoinets and the west end of Chavignon village. The 38th Division of XI Corps conformed and advanced on its objectives at Bois de Garenne and Orme Farm, between Fort de la Malmaison and the east end Chavignon. The road from Pargny-Filain to Chavignon was to be crossed to reach the objective at Many Farm to the east.

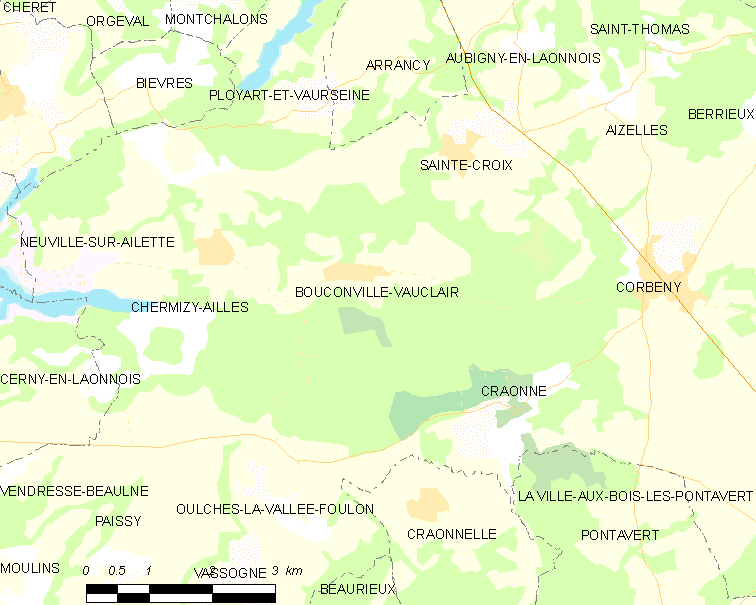
Map of Vauclair area (commune FR insee code 02102)

The 38th Division of XI Corps, was intended to cover the right flank of XXI Corps and to outflank Pargny-Filain, from the south. The 13th and 43rd divisions of XXI Corps and the 38th Division advanced simultaneously down the Malmaison heights, with tank support on the flanks, towards the edge of the plain south of the Ailette. French aeroplanes flew overhead, attacked German infantry and bombed trenches, roads and bridges. Behind the French troops on the right, at the summit of the Chemin-des-Dames ridge, a surprise was sprung by a line of French guns secretly placed behind the ridge, which began a creeping barrage. The 13th Division attacked Vaudesson and Bois de la Belle Croix, the 43rd Division advanced towards Montparnasse Quarry and the 38th Division entered the Bois de la Garenne and Orme Farm. Vaudesson village was threatened from the west flank by the 27th Division of XIV Corps, in Lizard Trench and was captured by the 21st Regiment and several tanks, as Bois de la Belle Croix further east was overrun by the 109th Regiment, which took 18 guns and several prisoners.

At Montparnasse Quarry, which had galleries 0.97 km (0.6 mi) long, the 1st Chasseur Battalion attack continued until the garrison surrendered at 10:30 a.m. and Orme Farm and a quarry to its left, were taken by the 38th Division. The French pressed on and drove the Germans from Bois de la Garenne and the open ground on its right. By 1:00 p.m., the French had reached the Chavignon brickfields and the east end of the village. The 38th Division crossed the Pargny-Filain–Chavignon road at the same time and attacked Many Farm. By 3:00 p.m., the division had fought through the east end Chavignon and had reached Voyen-Chavignon. An hour earlier, the 1st Chasseur Battalion had advanced from Montparnasse Quarry and taken the west end Chavignon. On their left, the 149th and 150th Infantry Regiments captured a German battalion at the Corbeau cavern and pushed the German defenders out of Bois des Hoinets.

==== XI Corps ====
South of the Pinon–Chavignon road, Pinon and Rosay forests extended to the south bank of the Canal de l'Oise à l'Aisne. The 66th Division and the left flank regiment of the 67th Division of XXXIX Corps, were to capture the Panthéon Farm fortifications, at the south-east end of the Malmaison plateau and to occupy the area round the Orage Quarry to the north, from the stump of Les Bovettes water-tower, to an underground quarry at the head of the Bovettes ravine, which descended to Pargny-Filain. The next objective was the Tonnerre Quarry, on the edge of the Malmaison plateau and after capturing Lützen Trench, the attackers were to drive the Germans from Bois de Veau, east of Fort de la Malmaison, on the slopes of the plateau opposite Pargny-Filain. The village of Pargny-Filain was to be occupied if possible.

The 66th Division was to swing eastwards and form a defensive flank on the east slopes of the plateau, to defend against counter-attacks, while the 38th Division and the XXI Corps divisions on the left, descended from the plateau to the plain of the Ailette. A wheeling manoeuvre so close to the Germans was hazardous and made worse by the narrowness of no man's land in this area, which prevented French from bombarding the German defences with super-heavy artillery; on 23 October, many of the trenches, barbed-wire entanglements and machine-gun nests remained intact. The defences were held by the 5th Prussian Guard Regiment and in the Panthéon and Orage quarries, whose garrisons had been relieved the night before by the 5th and 8th companies of the 3rd Grenadier Regiment, who had not been seriously shaken by the preliminary bombardment.

The 66th Division and the left hand regiment of the 67th Division, would be exposed to the German batteries on the Monampteuil heights, firing over the Bassin d'alimentation, which fed the Canal de l'Oise à l'Aisne, when they passed over the crest and began their descent. At Zero Hour, the 66th Division advanced behind a creeping bombardment, through German artillery and machine-gun counter-barrages, which caused many casualties, entered the German first position and fought hand-to-hand with the Prussian Guard. On the extreme right flank near La Royère Farm, the 67th Division made little headway but the 66th Division pushed on to the Panthéon, Orage and Bovettes quarries. By 9:00 a.m., the division had advanced between Fanion Trench, the east end of the German second position and Lützen Trench. Bois de Veau was entered but the division was not able to advance down the slopes to Pargny-Filain. The 67th Division had been repulsed from Tonnerre and other quarries and a further advance by the 66th Division was postponed until they were captured. During the night the division organised a defensive flank from Bois de Veau to Bovettes Quarry.

The 66th Division captured 2,500 prisoners, 15 guns, several trench mortars and a number of machine-guns. The 27th Division had reached Giraffe Trench, the Laffaux–Pinon ravine and was on the heights beyond the ravine west of Vaudesson. The XXI Corps divisions were in the village, the wooded ravine of Bois de la Belle Croix and Hoinets wood, the Montparnasse quarry and the western half of Chavignon. The 38th Division had reached the east end of Chavignon and Many Farm, beyond the Chavignon–Pargny-Filain road. The Allemant plateau, the Mont des Singes spur and the spur above Pinon, the Malmaison plateau with the fort at its centre and the northern slopes to the edge of the valley of the Ailette, had been captured. The salient facing the Ailette was over 4.8 km (3 mi) wide, into which artillery could be moved, using the vast Montparnasse and the other quarries as ammunition dumps. The salient protruded north from the Chemin-des-Dames towards the valley of the upper Ailette, which made the remaining German positions on the crest and the northern slopes of the ridge further east untenable.

=== 23–24 October ===
From 23–24 October, none of the expected counter-attacks by Group Vailly, from the Mont des Singes and Pinon plateaux, the Plain of the Ailette and the Chevregny spur occurred. Two Eingreif divisions had been committed between Allemant and Chavignon, a third had been pinned down around from Pargny-Filain–Filain and a fourth division, which arrived at Anizy during the battle, was unable to cross the Ailette owing to the French barrage. (Note: A German battalion commander captured in Pinon on 25 October, carried conflicting instructions, one ordering him to retire and one to hold on at all costs; similar orders were found on other captured officers.) Sporadic felling of fruit trees and demolitions either side of the Ailette, which had been seen by French airmen before the battle, became frequent and a pall of black smoke from fires, drifted over the plain. On 24 October, the Germans retired from the Mont des Singes and Pinon plateaux, pursued by the 28th Division from the Vauxaillon valley and the Allemant ravine. The Germans fled across the Ailette or into Pinon and the Pinon forest. French patrols from the Vaudesson–Chavignon area brought in more prisoners, which increased the bag beyond 8,000, along with 70 guns, 30 trench mortars and 80 machine-guns.

=== 25–27 October ===
On 25 October, Pinon was captured with 600 prisoners, Pinon and Rosay forests were entered and Rosay Farm was occupied, as XI Corps attacked from the Chemin-des-Dames ridge, to east of the Malmaison plateau and captured the farms of St. Martin and Chapelle Ste. Berthe to the south of Filain. The French then overran the Tonnerre and Charbon quarries, crossed the Bovettes ravine and ascended the slope from Many Farm to capture Pargny-Filain. The German defenders were eventually forced back, beyond the Bassin d'alimentation on the Monampteuil Heights. More than 2,000 prisoners and twenty more guns were taken, bringing the number of prisoners taken in the operation above 11,000. At Filain, part of the élite Konigin Elizabeth Guard Regiment surrendered, having had no food for three days.

On 25 October, the new front line ran from Vauxaillon, north of Mont des Singes, to the Canal de l'Oise à l'Aisne near Anizy, then north of Pinon and Rosay forests, south-eastwards to the west end of the Bassin d'alimentation, up to the Chemin-des-Dames ridge east of Pargny-Filain and Filain. Under bombardment by the German artillery round Anizy and Monampteuil, thousands of French Territorial troops, African and Chinese labourers extended roads from the French lines across no man's land. Engineer stores were rushed forward to repair captured caves, quarry entrances and field fortifications. On 26 October, XI Corps reduced the remaining strong points in Filain and reached the Bassin d'alimentation. The 67th Division pushed the Germans back over the Chevrégny Spur and on 27 October, one of the last German observation posts overlooking the Aisne, at Froidmont Farm to the south-east was captured.

=== German 7th Army, 23 October ===
The French artillery bombardment caused unprecedented destruction behind the German front, as far back as the canal and river bridges. At midnight on 22/23 October, the shelling increased to drumfire. The German artillery had been ordered to begin a counter-bombardment at 5:30 a.m. on 23 October, after the time of the attack was discovered from French prisoners. The French intercepted German wireless messages ordering the bombardment and brought the attack forward by thirty minutes. The density of the French creeping barrage was such, that the attack on Allemant was preceded by sixteen shells per minute, per 100 m (110 yd) of front. The barrage moved in 50 m (55 yd) bounds, followed closely by the French infantry, who found that most of the surviving German defenders were Shell shocked and still under cover. The German artillery south of the Ailette had little effect, because of losses to French counter-battery fire, lack of ammunition, lack of communication and loss of observation; the artillery on the north side of the river, was only able to fire after observation officers were sent forward to report.

The intensity of French artillery-fire and the gas cloud blocking the Ailette, left the German commanders ignorant of the situation on the south bank, except for a few messages delivered by runners, whose reports implied that the situation was hopeless. In some places, bypassed garrisons held out in quarry tunnels and machine-gun nests and the last troops of the 14th Division in Allemant were not overrun until 11:00 a.m. On the Soissons–Chavignon road, the 13th Division was only able to withstand the French attack for an hour but to the west of Fort de la Malmaison, the 2nd Guard Division repulsed the attack with massed machine-gun fire; at Malmaison a German artillery battery was overrun in hand-to-hand fighting. Chavignon was captured at 1:00 p.m. but a German counter-attack temporarily retook the north-eastern corner and little ground was lost by the 5th Guard Division further east.

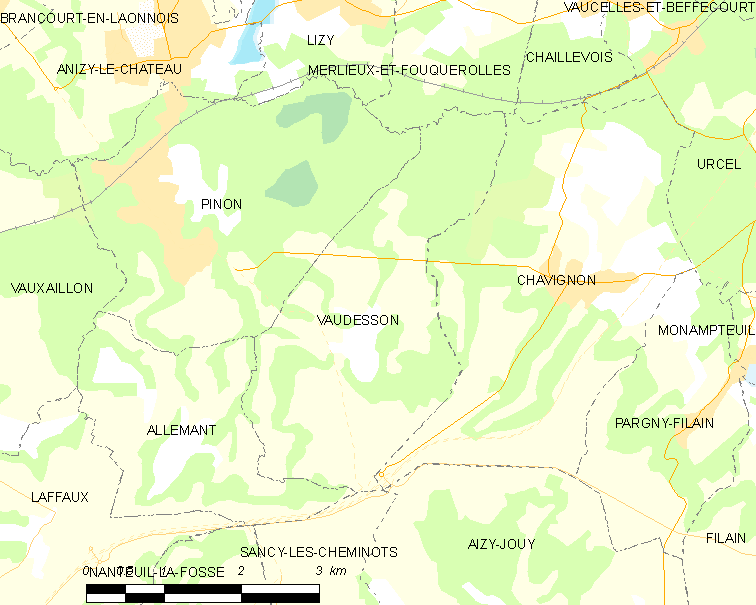
Map of the Vaudesson area (commune FR insee code 02766)

At noon, the 7th Army headquarters concluded that the loss of Allemant, Vaudesson, Chavignon and Malmaison, made it necessary to hold the lines from Pinon to Chavignon and to form a new line from there to Malmaison; it was also decided to withdraw the artillery from the Pinon Forest. At noon, Group Crépy was given command of the 52nd Division and Group Vailly command of the last two battalions of the 43rd Reserve and 9th divisions. The 6th Bavarian Reserve and the 6th Division were sent forward to Laon and Pierrepont, 12 km (7.5 mi) north-east of Laon and a division of the neighbouring 1st Army, was alerted to move to the battlefront on foot. At 1:00 p.m., reconnaissance flights revealed that the French had dug in at some points.

In Group Crépy, the 14th Division managed to form a continuous line along the Pinonriegel, to the original position on the right flank and no French attack ensued; at 2:45 p.m. the Group headquarters ordered the withdrawal of the remaining artillery, south of the canal. The situation on the front of Group Vailly was much worse, on the left flank of the 13th Division and part of the 2nd Guard Division front, no front line was recognisable. At Chavignon, a counter-attack recovered a small part of the village in the evening and at the eastern boundary of the French attack, the 5th Guard Division was able to repulse the attack, since the artillery positions north of the canal had suffered less damage and trench mortars had been dug into the front line before Operation "Autumn Harvest". Few of the mortars had been damaged and were used to engage the French infantry, who were repulsed along most of the position, except on the west flank, which was withdrawn to conform with the retreat of the neighbouring divisions.

On the extreme flanks of the attack front, the French limited their operations to artillery-fire and probing attacks and in the late afternoon, French artillery-fire diminished. By the evening, the German line ran from the plateau east of Vauxaillon, along the Pinonriegel north of Vaudesson and Chavignon, to the high ground of the ridge south-west of Pargny and then connected to the old position. About seven infantry regiments and much of the artillery had been lost. A counter-attack was impossible and it was decided that the area south of the canal, should be retained only as an outpost area, with a main defensive position being established north of the canal and river Ailette, once the remaining artillery had been removed. The night of 23/24 October was quiet and during the day, only minor skirmishing took place, as the French consolidated.

The 7th Army commander, Boehn, concluded that the Chemin des Dames was untenable and proposed to retire, even though this would require the abandonment of the defences for another 20 km (12 mi) to the east, as far as Craonne and reserve positions on high ground about 3 km (1.9 mi) further back, as well as the Laffaux Salient. Boehn decided to implement the Bunzelwitz Bewegung (Bunzelwitz Manoeuvre) contingency plan, part of the Gudrun Bewegung (Gudrun Manoeuvre) prepared earlier in the year. In view of the sacrifices made during the Nivelle Offensive, the headquarters of Army Group German Crown Prince, ordered that a retirement by the six divisions along the Chemin-des-Dames, east of the 5th Guard Division could not begin unless a big French attack was imminent but that preparations were to be made, for the abandonment the ground south of the Ailette and the canal. The 7th Army was quickly to remove the remaining artillery and the 3rd Bavarian, 30th and 103rd divisions were to moved close to the threatened sector of the front, though exhausted, ready for use as Eingreif divisions.

=== 25 October ===
On 25 October, the French attacked again and the German troops made a fighting withdrawal to the Ailette and the canal, which had been occupied by the 6th Bavarian Reserve and 6th divisions but few guns could be withdrawn. The Oberste Heeresleitung (OHL, Supreme Army Command) received a broadcast from the Eiffel Tower, in which the French announced the capture of 8,000 prisoners and 25 heavy guns, then mistakenly reported that the canal had been crossed near Anizy, which caused a temporary panic in OHL that the Ailette position and the Siegfriedstellung (Hindenburg Line) had been outflanked. General Erich Ludendorff was told by the 7th Army Chief of Staff Friedrich Graf von der Schulenburg, that the army had no resources left to resist a French attack and was given the 21st and 28th Reserve divisions as reinforcements. The Chiefs of Staff of the defeated groups were sacked and it was agreed with Army Group German Crown Prince, that the Bunzelwitz Bewegung (Bunzelwitz Manoeuvre) should begin on 26 October. The salient formed at Anizy was the area most vulnerable to attack and the Army Group reinforced Group Crépy with the 14th Reserve and 103rd divisions.

=== Bunzelwitz Bewegung 1/2 November ===
Defence in depth was not possible in the area of Group Vailly, which held positions on the edge of the hog's back ridge of the Chemin-des-Dames, south of the Ailette. A quick withdrawal of the artillery would be impossible if the French infantry crowned the crest and gained observation over the canal crossings, which were within range of French artillery. When the front line fell, the 7th Army had no option but to withdraw Group Vailly north of the Ailette, abandoning the Montparnasse and other quarries, which had become death traps. Army Group German Crown Prince ordered the 7th Army to hold the positions east of La Royère Farm and on 28 October, the Germans counter-attacked just north of Froidmont Farm but were repulsed and lost another 60 prisoners. On 30 October, a German counter-attack near Cerny was also repulsed. The French brought more artillery onto the Allemant and Malmaison plateaux, the Pinon and Rosay forests and the vicinity of Pargny-Filain and Filain. The French guns enfiladed the Ailette valley to the east of the Bassin d'alimentation reservoir, bombarded the German defences on the north slopes of the Chemin-des-Dames ridge and the last strong points holding out on the summit with high-explosive, gas and shrapnel shell.

On the night of 1/2 November, the German retirement to the north bank of the Ailette began. To avoid alerting the French, no demolitions of shelters, tunnels and pillboxes were made and a screen of machine-gunners and riflemen was left on the summit of the ridge to fire until just before dawn. The Bunzelwitz Bewegung was completed without alerting the French, who bombarded the empty positions along the Chemin-des-Dames during the morning of 2 November. A party of Chasseurs found an empty German trench and the field artillery opened a creeping barrage, behind which waves of infantry advanced over the crest. By mid-day Cerny was occupied, Cortecon was entered at 3:00 p.m. and Ailles at 7:00 p.m., which the Germans then bombarded with mustard-gas shell. The advance was cautious, due to fear that caves and tunnels had been mined but by the morning of 3 November, the French had advanced on a 21 km (13 mi) front to the south bank of the Ailette. North-east of Craonne, the ruins of Chevreux were occupied, patrols reached the southern outskirts of Corbeny and another twenty heavy and field guns were captured.

== Aftermath ==
=== Analysis ===
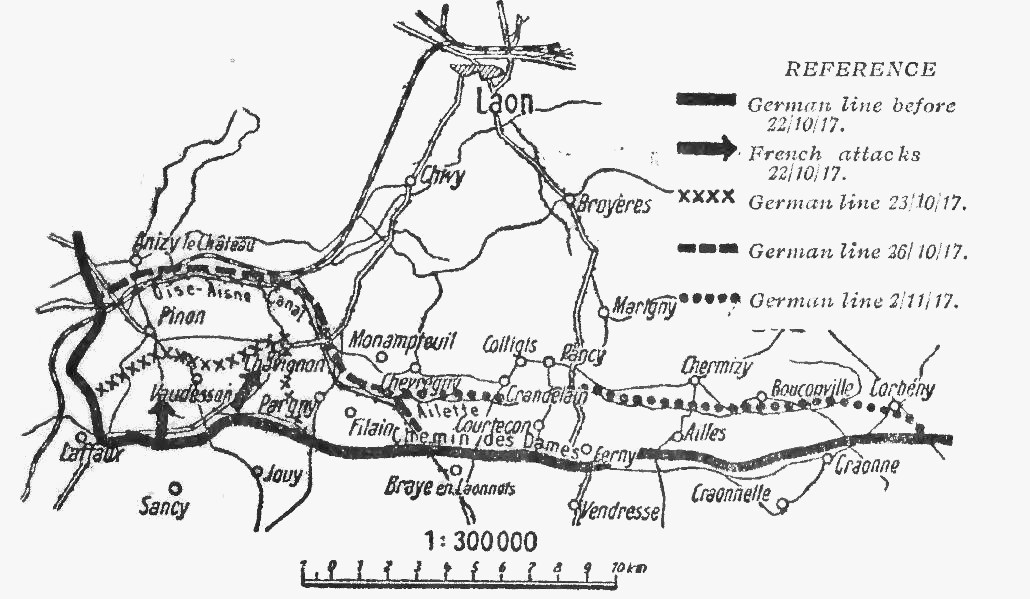
German retreat from the Chemin des Dames, November 1917

In 2018, Michel Goya wrote that the tanks had been more effective than in April and May but were still mechanically unreliable, with a 25 per cent breakdown rate and that the modifications did not alter the mechanical wear on the vehicles. Medium tanks were vulnerable and lacked the manoeuvrability to cross severely cratered ground. The crews found it hard to reach objectives and became much more vulnerable when stationary. The offensive had been intended to capture high ground from the Mont des Singes to the Californie Plateau above Craonne and be economical in infantry, rather than break through the German fortified zone. Pétain issued a communiqué on the evening of 23 October, announcing that the Sixth Army had taken more than 7,500 prisoners and an enormous quantity of equipment, including 25 heavy and field guns.

While the German 7th Army occupied the Mont des Singes, Laffaux, Allemant and Malmaison plateaux, the French positions north of the Aisne were vulnerable to attack and the alternative for the French was to fall back behind the Aisne. On 24 October, a German communiqué announced that Allemant, Vaudesson and Chavignon had been lost but claimed victory west of La Royère Farm, where no attack had taken place. On 25 October, Pinon and the forest had been captured and the French closed up to the line of the Canal de l'Oise à l'Aisne. In four days, the French had advanced 9.7 km (6 mi) and forced the Germans from the plateau of the Chemin des Dames to the north bank of the Ailette valley. The attacks at Verdun in August and at Malmaison were compared with the failures of the Nivelle Offensive and were used to produce L’instruction sur l’action offensive des grands unités dans la bataille (Instruction on Offensive Action of Large Units in Battle [31 October 1917]).

The French success at La Malmaison prevented Hindenburg and Ludendorff from further reinforcing the Austro-Hungarians in Italy and assisted the surprise gained by the British at the Battle of Cambrai (20 November – 7 December). The ground taken by the Sixth Army increased the difficulties of the Germans in the spring offensives of 1918. Had the 7th Army retained the western end of the Chemin-des-Dames ridge, the German offensive in 1918 could have started simultaneously with the offensives from the Somme to Flanders. The extension of the northern face of the salient from Vauxaillon to Craonne and Berry-au-Bac, beyond the Chemin-des-Dames ridge to the left bank of the Ailette during the Battle of Malmaison, caused Ludendorff to hold back Heeresgruppe Deutscher Kronprinz (Army Group German Crown Prince), until Allied reserves had been shifted west and north of Soissons. Had the 7th Army retained the western end of the ridge, the French at the east end and between the ridge and the Aisne, would have been highly vulnerable to a simultaneous attack.

The official historians of the Reichsarchiv wrote that the German defence had been outnumbered threefold in artillery, which had prepared the attack with almost unlimited ammunition. The closure by gas bombardment of the Ailette valley a few days before the French attack, had made withdrawal impossible (as had a similar bombardment at Verdun in August), which accounted for the French claim of 11,500 prisoners, along with 200 guns, 222 trench mortars and 700 machine-guns. The Reichsarchiv historians recorded 18,000 casualties, of whom 10,000 were missing. The magnitude of the defeat, after the severity of the losses at Messines Ridge, Verdun and Ypres, showed that carefully prepared attacks against German defences in tactically unfavourable positions could inflict costly defeats. Such defeats could have been mitigated by German tactical withdrawals, as soon as Allied artillery preparation began. The Laffaux Salient had been retained despite the risks, because of the confidence of the local commanders in the fortifications and as a jumping-off point for an offensive in 1918.

=== Casualties ===
The French suffered casualties of 2,241 men killed, 8,162 wounded and 1,460 missing from 23 to 26 October, 10 per cent of the casualties of the attacks during the Nivelle Offensive in April and May. The Sixth Army took 11,157 prisoners, 180 guns, 222 trench mortars and 720 machine-guns. In 2014, William Philpott wrote that the Germans suffered casualties of 38,000 killed or missing and 12,000 prisoners, 200 guns and 720 machine-guns, against 14,000 French casualties, fewer than a third of the German total. German casualties at the Battle of the Hills 17 April – 20 May, were 6,120 prisoners, 52 guns, 42 trench-mortars and 103 machine-guns. At Verdun, from 20 to 24 August the Second Army had taken 8,100 prisoners.
