= Pargny =

Pargny may refer to the following places in France:

- Bois-lès-Pargny, Aisne
- Pargny, Rethel, Ardennes
- Pargny, Somme
- Pargny-et-Filain, Aisne
- Pargny-Filain, Aisne
- Pargny-la-Dhuys, Aisne
- Pargny-les-Bois, Aisne
- Pargny-lès-Reims, Marne
- Pargny-sous-Mureau, Vosges
- Pargny-sur-Saulx, Marne
