= 02456 =

02456 may refer to:

- Newton, Massachusetts, U.S., a city
- Hingoli, a city in Maharashtra, India
- Manicamp, a commune in Aisne department, France
