= Filain =

Filain may refer to the following places in France:

- Filain, Aisne, a former commune in the department of Aisne
- Filain, Haute-Saône, a commune in the department of Haute-Saône
