= Sainte-Croix, Aisne =

Sainte-Croix
- Commune
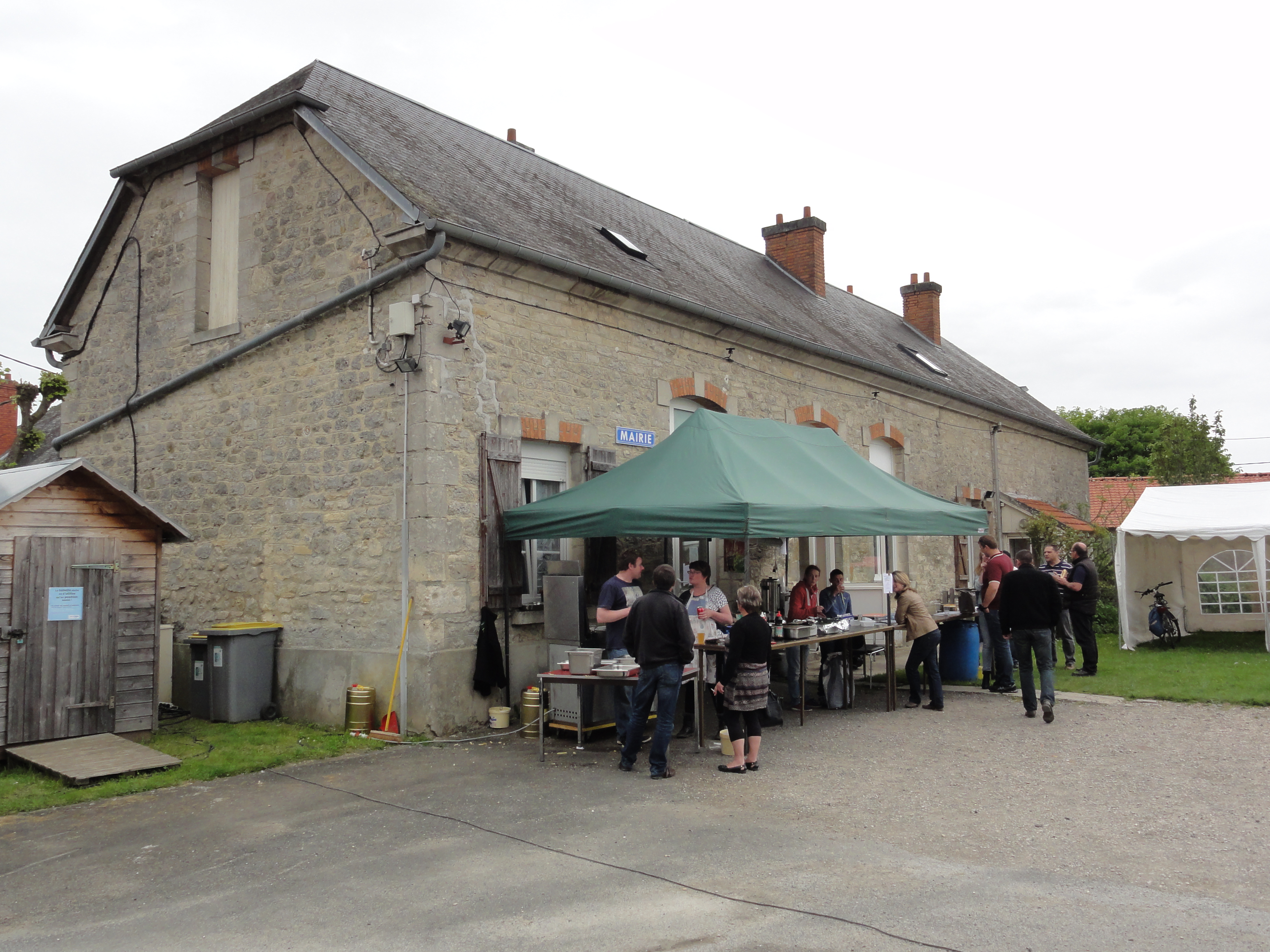
- The town hall of Sainte-Croix
- Location of Sainte-Croix
- Location within France Location within Hauts-de-France
- Coordinates: 49°28′56″N 3°46′48″E
- Country: France
- Region: Hauts-de-France
- Department: Aisne
- Arrondissement: Laon
- Canton: Villeneuve-sur-Aisne
- Intercommunality: Chemin des Dames

Government
  - Mayor (2026–32): Sarah Flamant
- Area^{1}: 3.35 km^{2} (1.29 sq mi)
- Elevation: 102 m (335 ft)
- Highest elevation: 198 m (650 ft)
- Lowest elevation: 101 m (331 ft)
- Population (2023): 127
  - Density: 37.9/km^{2} (98.2/sq mi)
- Time zone: UTC+01:00 (CET)
  - Summer (DST): UTC+02:00 (CEST)
- INSEE/Postal code: 02675 /02820
- ^{1} French Land Register data, which excludes lakes, ponds, glaciers > 1 km^{2} (0.386 sq mi or 247 acres) and river estuaries.

Sainte-Croix (French pronunciation: [sɛ̃t kʁwa]) is a commune in the Aisne department in Hauts-de-France in northern France.

== Geography ==
The river Ailette has its source in the commune.

== Population ==
Historical population
Year	Pop.	±% p.a.
1968	103	—
1975	103	+0.00%
1982	113	+1.33%
1990	115	+0.22%
1999	124	+0.84%
2007	133	+0.88%
2012	133	+0.00%
2017	130	−0.46%
2023	127	−0.39%
Source: INSEE

== See also ==
- Communes of the Aisne department
