= Trucy =

- Commune
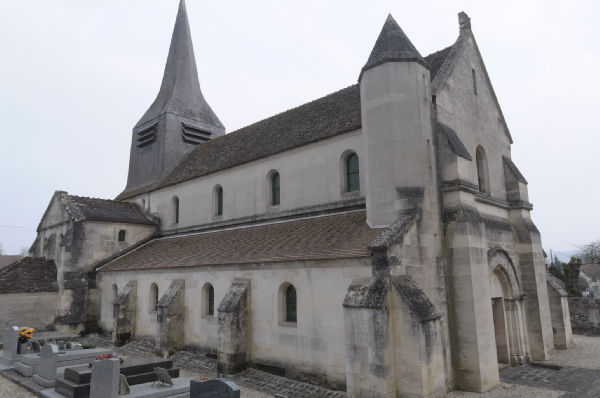
- The church of Trucy
- Location of Trucy
- Location within France Location within Hauts-de-France
- Coordinates: 49°28′19″N 3°36′47″E
- Country: France
- Region: Hauts-de-France
- Department: Aisne
- Arrondissement: Laon
- Canton: Villeneuve-sur-Aisne
- Intercommunality: Chemin des Dames

Government
  - Mayor (2026–32): Gilles Posset
- Area^{1}: 3.01 km^{2} (1.16 sq mi)
- Elevation: 100 m (330 ft)
- Highest elevation: 173 m (568 ft)
- Lowest elevation: 66 m (217 ft)
- Population (2023): 139
  - Density: 46.2/km^{2} (120/sq mi)
- Time zone: UTC+01:00 (CET)
  - Summer (DST): UTC+02:00 (CEST)
- INSEE/Postal code: 02751 /02860
- ^{1} French Land Register data, which excludes lakes, ponds, glaciers > 1 km^{2} (0.386 sq mi or 247 acres) and river estuaries.

Trucy (French pronunciation: [tʁysi]) is a commune in the Aisne department in Hauts-de-France in northern France.

== Geography ==
The river Ailette forms all of the commune's southern border.

== Population ==
Historical population
Year	Pop.	±% p.a.
1968	72	—
1975	69	−0.61%
1982	84	+2.85%
1990	112	+3.66%
1999	115	+0.29%
2007	134	+1.93%
2012	158	+3.35%
2017	145	−1.70%
2023	139	−0.70%
Source: INSEE

== See also ==
- Communes of the Aisne department
