= Pont-Saint-Mard =

- Commune
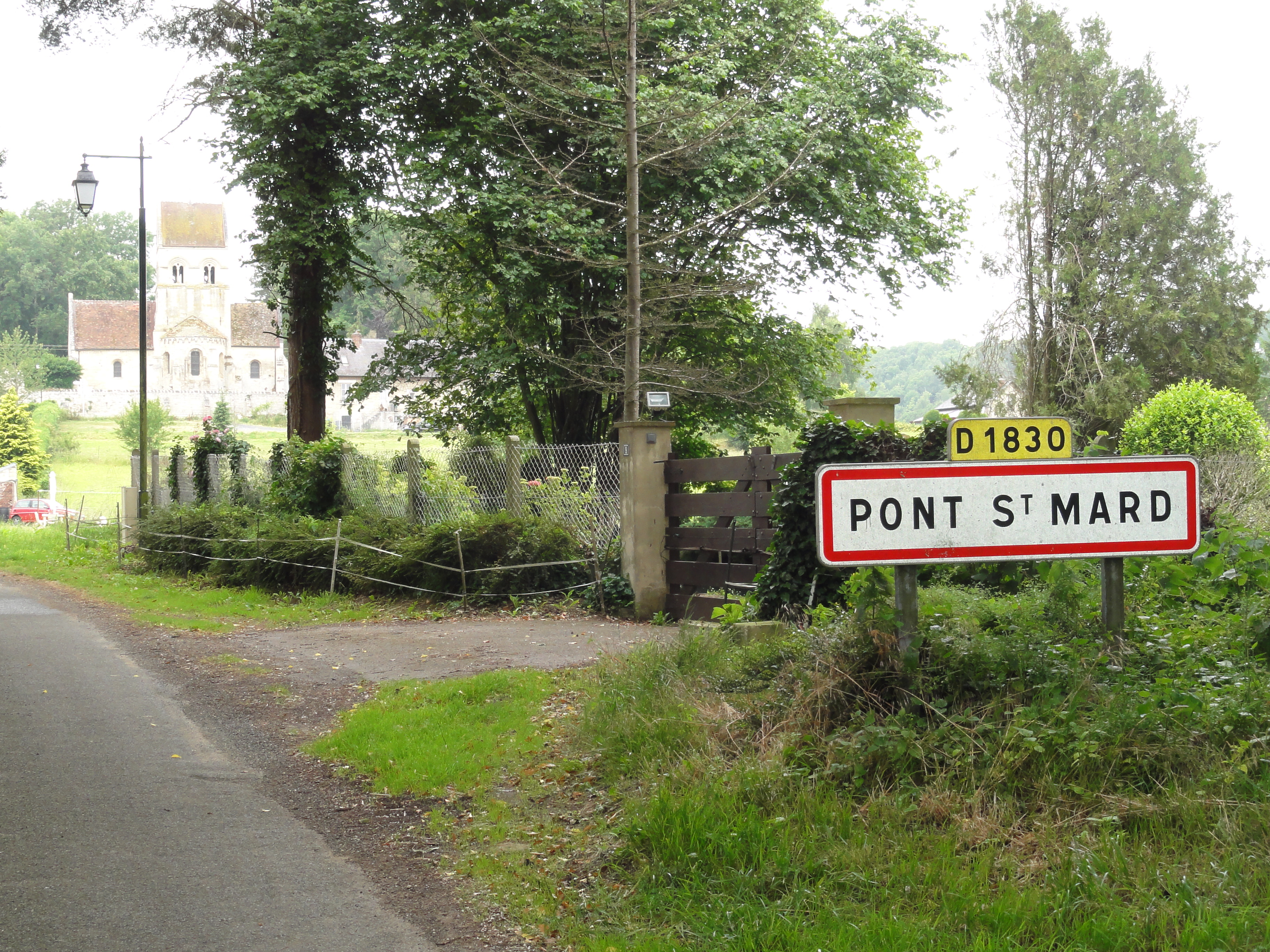
- The road into Pont-Saint-Mard
- Location of Pont-Saint-Mard
- Location within France Location within Hauts-de-France
- Coordinates: 49°29′53″N 3°17′09″E
- Country: France
- Region: Hauts-de-France
- Department: Aisne
- Arrondissement: Laon
- Canton: Vic-sur-Aisne

Government
  - Mayor (2026–32): Didier Boudsocq
- Area^{1}: 6.79 km^{2} (2.62 sq mi)
- Elevation: 70 m (230 ft)
- Highest elevation: 158 m (518 ft)
- Lowest elevation: 46 m (151 ft)
- Population (2023): 176
  - Density: 25.9/km^{2} (67.1/sq mi)
- Time zone: UTC+01:00 (CET)
  - Summer (DST): UTC+02:00 (CEST)
- INSEE/Postal code: 02616 /02380
- ^{1} French Land Register data, which excludes lakes, ponds, glaciers > 1 km^{2} (0.386 sq mi or 247 acres) and river estuaries.

Pont-Saint-Mard (French pronunciation: [pɔ̃ sɛ̃ maʁ]) is a commune in the Aisne department of Hauts-de-France in northern France.

== Geography ==
The river Ailette forms most of the commune's northern border.

== Population ==
Historical population
Year	Pop.	±% p.a.
1968	235	—
1975	220	−0.94%
1982	201	−1.28%
1990	195	−0.38%
1999	179	−0.95%
2007	177	−0.14%
2012	190	+1.43%
2017	205	+1.53%
2023	176	−2.51%
Source: INSEE

== See also ==
- Communes of the Aisne department
- List of medieval bridges in France
