= Pancy-Courtecon =

- Commune
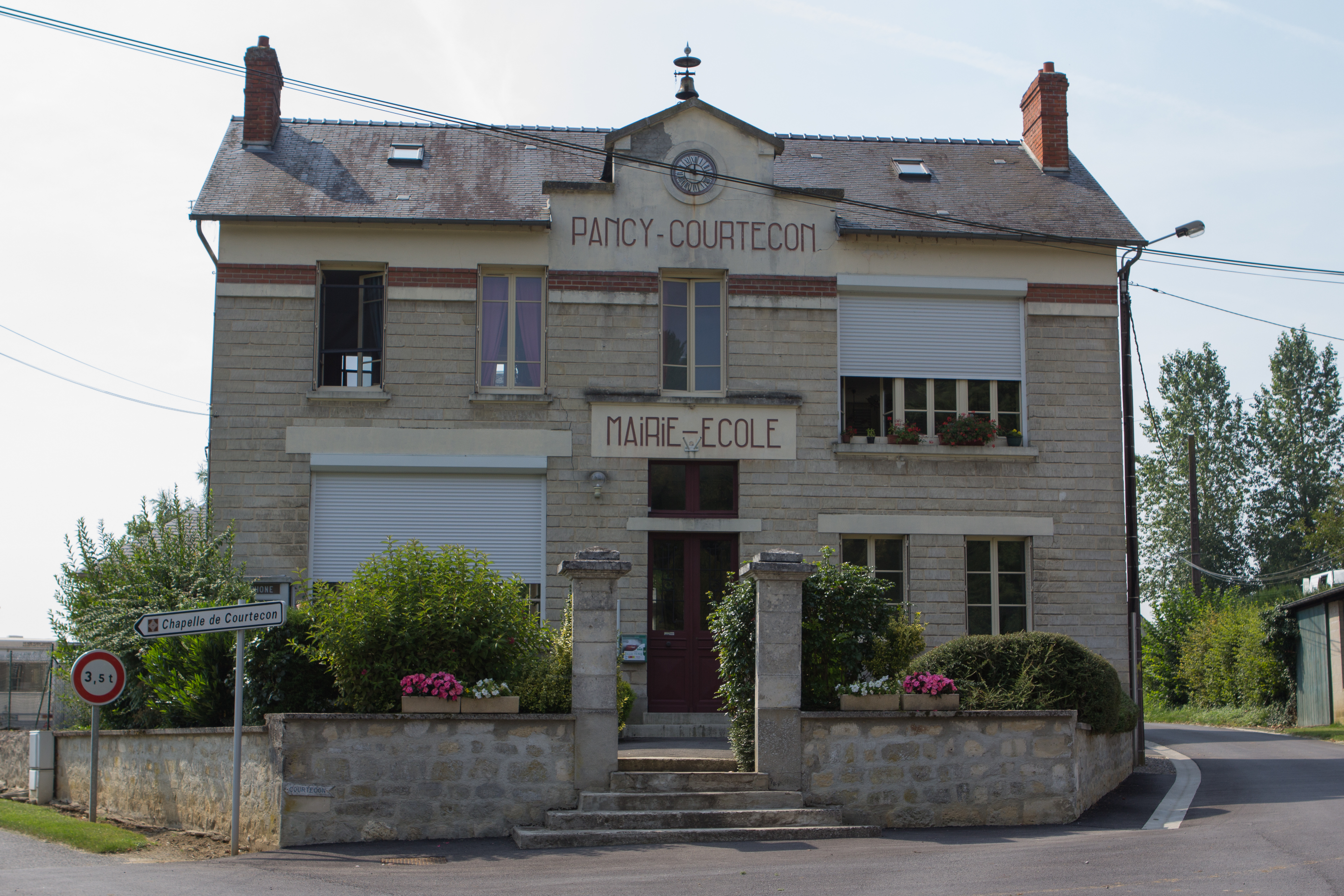
- The town hall of Pancy-Courtecon
- Location of Pancy-Courtecon
- Location within France Location within Hauts-de-France
- Coordinates: 49°28′28″N 3°39′18″E
- Country: France
- Region: Hauts-de-France
- Department: Aisne
- Arrondissement: Laon
- Canton: Villeneuve-sur-Aisne
- Intercommunality: Chemin des Dames

Government
  - Mayor (2026–32): Martine Bricot
- Area^{1}: 6.37 km^{2} (2.46 sq mi)
- Elevation: 104 m (341 ft)
- Highest elevation: 181 m (594 ft)
- Lowest elevation: 70 m (230 ft)
- Population (2023): 60
  - Density: 9.4/km^{2} (24/sq mi)
- Time zone: UTC+01:00 (CET)
  - Summer (DST): UTC+02:00 (CEST)
- INSEE/Postal code: 02583 /02860
- ^{1} French Land Register data, which excludes lakes, ponds, glaciers > 1 km^{2} (0.386 sq mi or 247 acres) and river estuaries.

Pancy-Courtecon is a commune in the Aisne department and Hauts-de-France region of northern France.

== Geography ==
The river Ailette flows west through the commune.

== Population ==
Historical population
Year	Pop.	±% p.a.
1968	67	—
1975	51	−3.82%
1982	59	+2.10%
1990	56	−0.65%
1999	52	−0.82%
2007	45	−1.79%
2012	54	+3.71%
2017	56	+0.73%
2023	60	+1.16%
Source: INSEE

== See also ==
- Communes of the Aisne department
