= Filain, Aisne =

Filain
- Part of Pargny-et-Filain
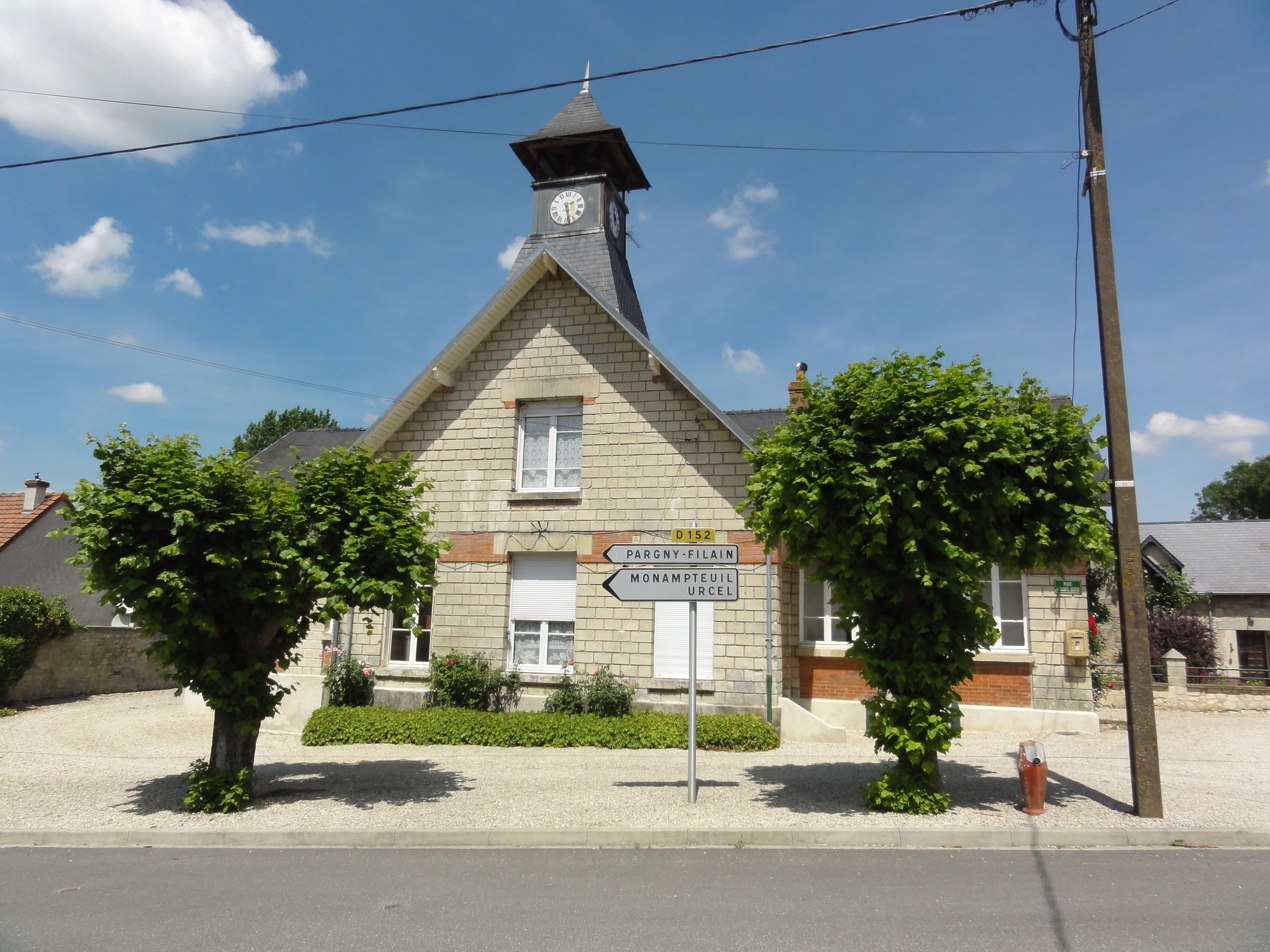
- The town hall of Filain
- Location of Filain
- Location within France Location within Hauts-de-France
- Coordinates: 49°27′36″N 3°33′23″E
- Country: France
- Region: Hauts-de-France
- Department: Aisne
- Arrondissement: Soissons
- Canton: Fère-en-Tardenois
- Intercommunality: Val de l'Aisne
- Commune: Pargny-et-Filain
- Area^{1}: 4.78 km^{2} (1.85 sq mi)
- Elevation: 178 m (584 ft)
- Highest elevation: 198 m (650 ft)
- Lowest elevation: 64 m (210 ft)
- Population (2022): 121
  - Density: 25.3/km^{2} (65.6/sq mi)
- Time zone: UTC+01:00 (CET)
  - Summer (DST): UTC+02:00 (CEST)
- Postal code: 02000
- ^{1} French Land Register data, which excludes lakes, ponds, glaciers > 1 km^{2} (0.386 sq mi or 247 acres) and river estuaries.

Filain (French pronunciation: [filɛ̃]) is a former commune in the Aisne department in Hauts-de-France in northern France. It was merged with Pargny-Filain to form Pargny-et-Filain on 1 January 2025.

== Geography ==
The river Ailette forms all of the commune's northern border.

== Population ==
Historical population
Year	Pop.	±% p.a.
1968	98	—
1975	89	−1.37%
1982	81	−1.34%
1990	85	+0.60%
1999	89	+0.51%
2007	123	+4.13%
2012	133	+1.58%
2017	129	−0.61%
Source: INSEE

== See also ==
- Communes of the Aisne department
