= Monampteuil =

- Commune
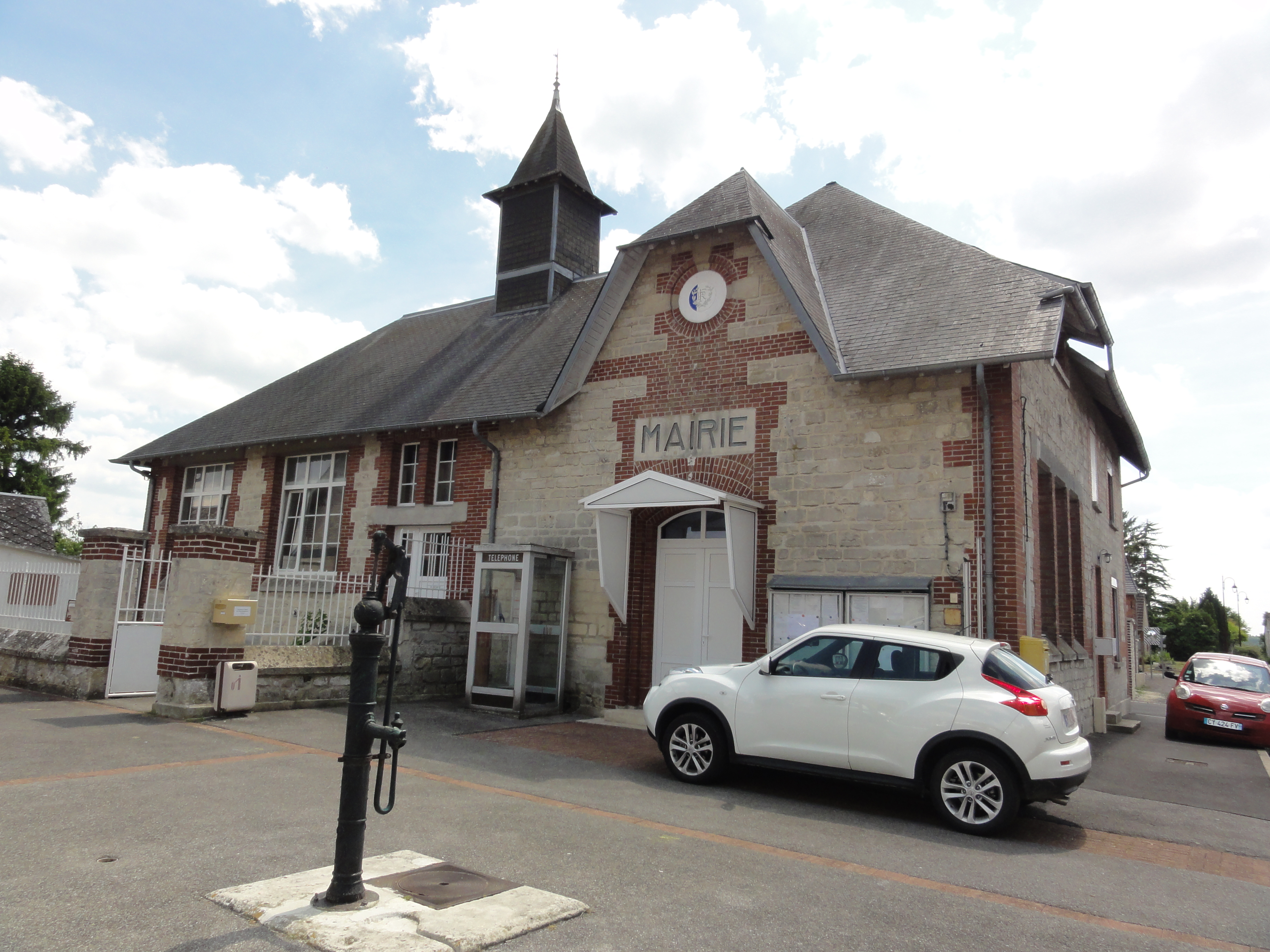
- The town hall of Monampteuil
- Location of Monampteuil
- Location within France Location within Hauts-de-France
- Coordinates: 49°28′36″N 3°34′24″E
- Country: France
- Region: Hauts-de-France
- Department: Aisne
- Arrondissement: Soissons
- Canton: Fère-en-Tardenois
- Intercommunality: Val de l'Aisne

Government
  - Mayor (2026–32): Gaëlle Boinet
- Area^{1}: 5.86 km^{2} (2.26 sq mi)
- Elevation: 153 m (502 ft)
- Highest elevation: 189 m (620 ft)
- Lowest elevation: 64 m (210 ft)
- Population (2023): 122
  - Density: 20.8/km^{2} (53.9/sq mi)
- Time zone: UTC+01:00 (CET)
  - Summer (DST): UTC+02:00 (CEST)
- INSEE/Postal code: 02490 /02000
- ^{1} French Land Register data, which excludes lakes, ponds, glaciers > 1 km^{2} (0.386 sq mi or 247 acres) and river estuaries.

Monampteuil (French pronunciation: [mɔnɑ̃ptœj]) is a commune in the Aisne department in Hauts-de-France in northern France.

== Geography ==
The river Ailette forms part of the commune's southern border.

== Population ==
Historical population
Year	Pop.	±% p.a.
1968	113	—
1975	126	+1.57%
1982	113	−1.54%
1990	123	+1.07%
1999	154	+2.53%
2007	129	−2.19%
2012	133	+0.61%
2017	131	−0.30%
2023	122	−1.18%
Source: INSEE

== See also ==
- Communes of the Aisne department
