= Vaudesson =

- Commune
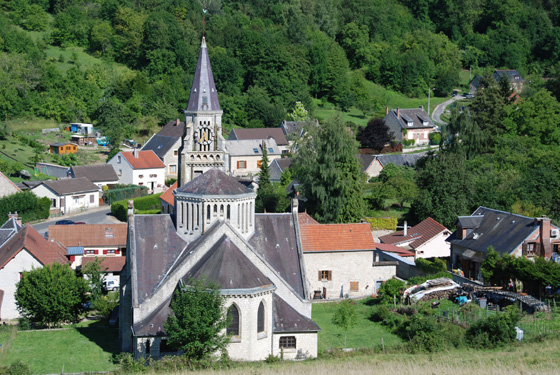
- The church of Vaudesson
- Location of Vaudesson
- Location within France Location within Hauts-de-France
- Coordinates: 49°28′17″N 3°29′10″E
- Country: France
- Region: Hauts-de-France
- Department: Aisne
- Arrondissement: Soissons
- Canton: Fère-en-Tardenois
- Intercommunality: Val de l'Aisne

Government
  - Mayor (2026–32): Michaël Prongué
- Area^{1}: 8.42 km^{2} (3.25 sq mi)
- Elevation: 100 m (330 ft)
- Highest elevation: 194 m (636 ft)
- Lowest elevation: 58 m (190 ft)
- Population (2023): 237
  - Density: 28.1/km^{2} (72.9/sq mi)
- Time zone: UTC+01:00 (CET)
  - Summer (DST): UTC+02:00 (CEST)
- INSEE/Postal code: 02766 /02320
- ^{1} French Land Register data, which excludes lakes, ponds, glaciers > 1 km^{2} (0.386 sq mi or 247 acres) and river estuaries.

Vaudesson is a commune in the Aisne department in Hauts-de-France in northern France.

== Geography ==
The river Ailette forms all of the commune's northern border.

== Population ==
Historical population
Year	Pop.	±% p.a.
1968	220	—
1975	192	−1.93%
1982	178	−1.08%
1990	153	−1.87%
1999	178	+1.70%
2007	260	+4.85%
2012	257	−0.23%
2017	238	−1.52%
2023	237	−0.07%
Source: INSEE

== See also ==
- Communes of the Aisne department
