= Manicamp =

- Commune
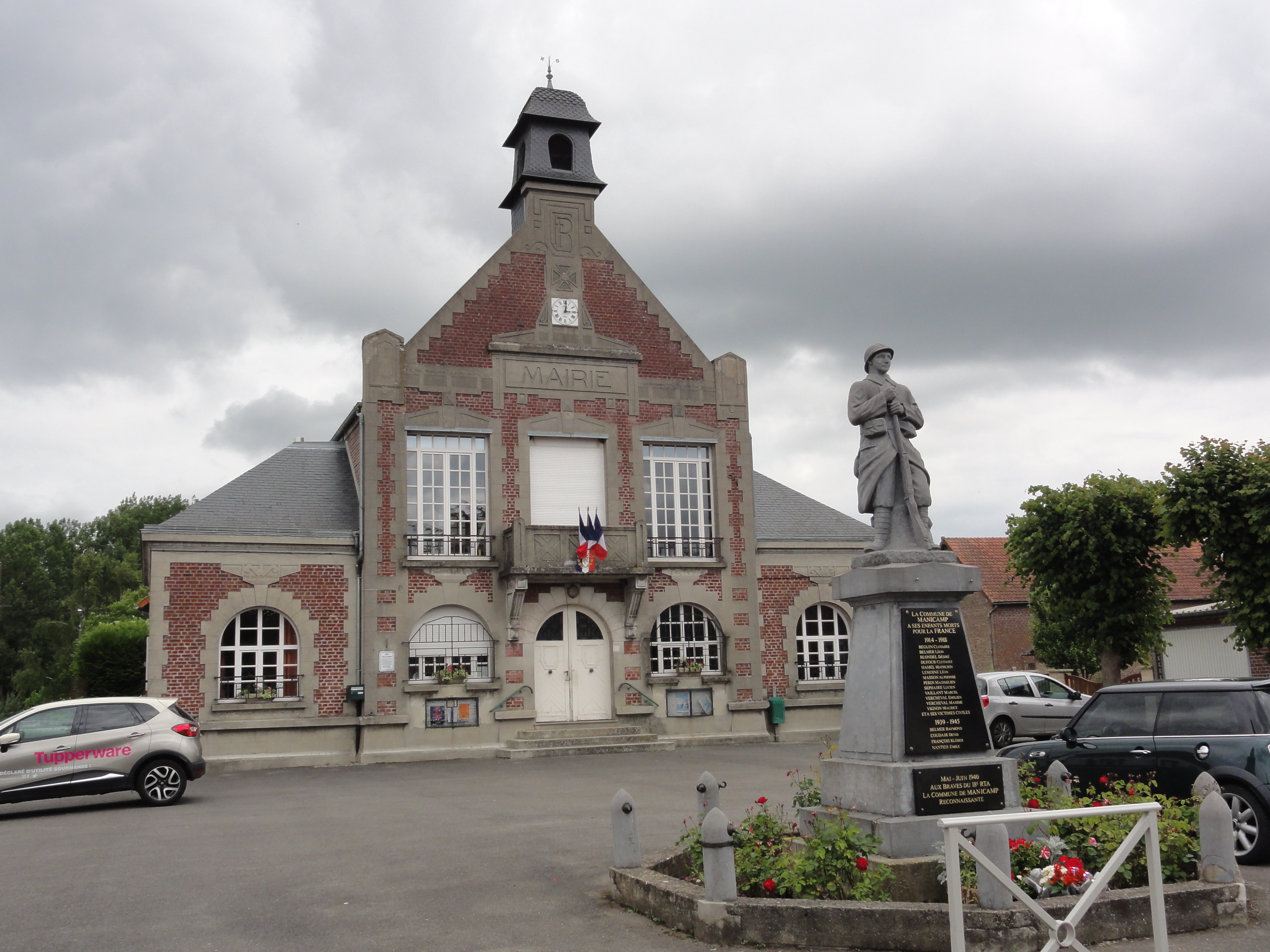
- The town hall of Manicamp
- Location of Manicamp
- Location within France Location within Hauts-de-France
- Coordinates: 49°34′21″N 3°10′15″E
- Country: France
- Region: Hauts-de-France
- Department: Aisne
- Arrondissement: Laon
- Canton: Vic-sur-Aisne
- Intercommunality: CA Chauny Tergnier La Fère

Government
  - Mayor (2026–32): Luc Degonville
- Area^{1}: 10.24 km^{2} (3.95 sq mi)
- Elevation: 38 m (125 ft)
- Highest elevation: 69 m (226 ft)
- Lowest elevation: 38 m (125 ft)
- Population (2023): 311
  - Density: 30.4/km^{2} (78.7/sq mi)
- Time zone: UTC+01:00 (CET)
  - Summer (DST): UTC+02:00 (CEST)
- INSEE/Postal code: 02456 /02300
- ^{1} French Land Register data, which excludes lakes, ponds, glaciers > 1 km^{2} (0.386 sq mi or 247 acres) and river estuaries.

Manicamp (French pronunciation: [manikɑ̃]) is a commune in the Aisne department in Hauts-de-France in northern France.

== Geography ==
The villages is located in the northwestern part of the commune, on the left bank of the river Ailette, which flows west through the northern part of the commune, then joins the Oise, which forms most of the commune's northern border.

== Population ==
Historical population
Year	Pop.	±% p.a.
1968	336	—
1975	317	−0.83%
1982	313	−0.18%
1990	333	+0.78%
1999	344	+0.36%
2007	315	−1.09%
2012	318	+0.19%
2017	307	−0.70%
2023	311	+0.22%
Source: INSEE

== See also ==
- Communes of the Aisne department
