= Pargny-Filain =

- Part of Pargny-et-Filain
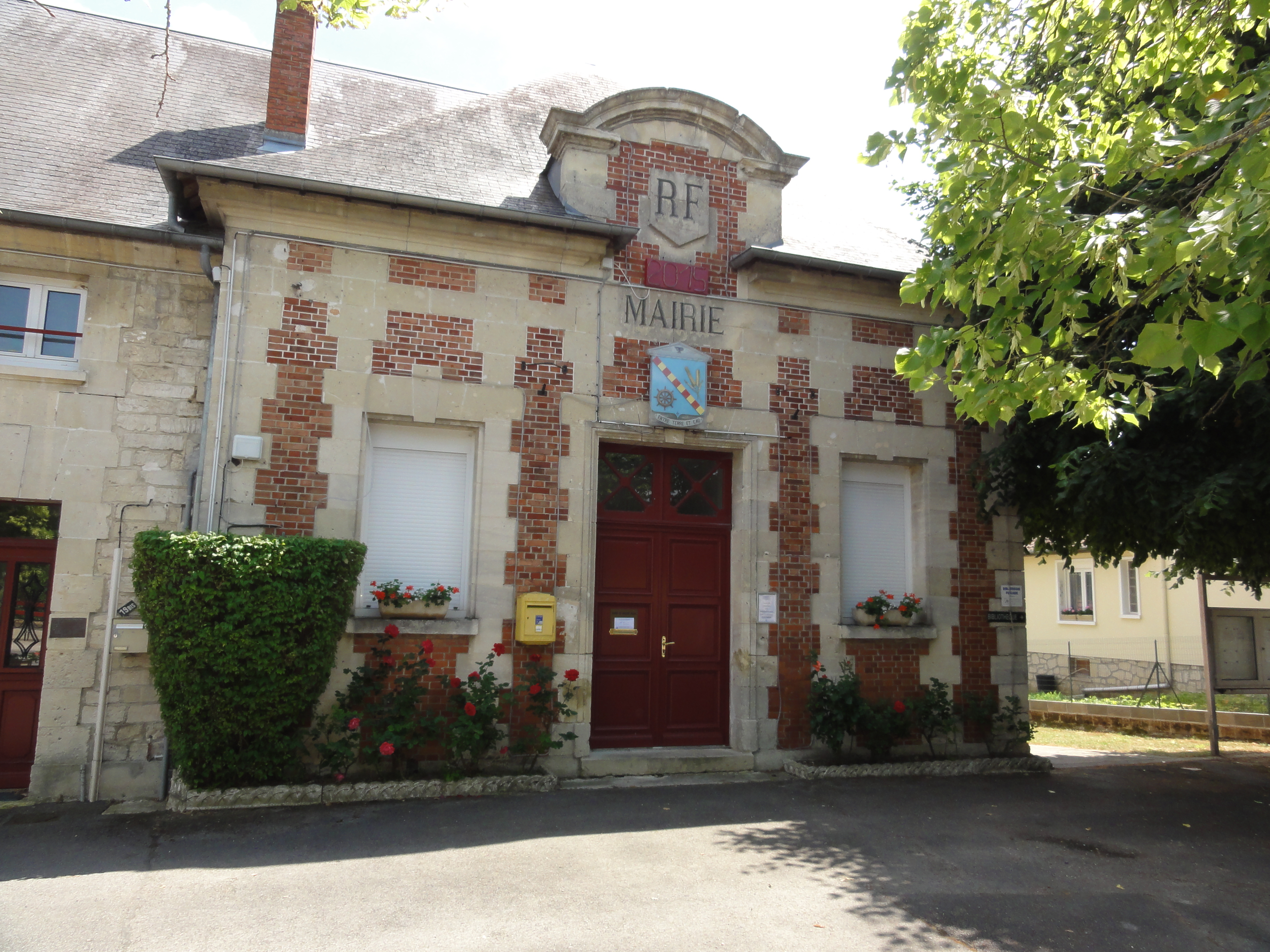
- The town hall of Pargny-Filain

- Coat of arms
- Location of Pargny-Filain
- Location within France Location within Hauts-de-France
- Coordinates: 49°27′52″N 3°32′43″E
- Country: France
- Region: Hauts-de-France
- Department: Aisne
- Arrondissement: Soissons
- Canton: Fère-en-Tardenois
- Intercommunality: Val de l'Aisne
- Commune: Pargny-et-Filain
- Area^{1}: 5.01 km^{2} (1.93 sq mi)
- Elevation: 105 m (344 ft)
- Highest elevation: 192 m (630 ft)
- Lowest elevation: 62 m (203 ft)
- Population (2022): 250
  - Density: 50/km^{2} (130/sq mi)
- Time zone: UTC+01:00 (CET)
  - Summer (DST): UTC+02:00 (CEST)
- Postal code: 02000
- ^{1} French Land Register data, which excludes lakes, ponds, glaciers > 1 km^{2} (0.386 sq mi or 247 acres) and river estuaries.

Pargny-Filain (French pronunciation: [paʁɲi filɛ̃]) is a former commune in the Aisne department in Hauts-de-France in northern France. It was merged with Filain to form Pargny-et-Filain on 1 January 2025.

== Geography ==
The river Ailette forms part of the commune's northeastern border.

== Population ==
Historical population
Year	Pop.	±% p.a.
1968	133	—
1975	147	+1.44%
1982	191	+3.81%
1990	195	+0.26%
1999	201	+0.34%
2007	232	+1.81%
2012	245	+1.10%
2017	259	+1.12%
Source: INSEE

== See also ==
- Communes of the Aisne department
