= Ailette (river) =

River in northern France

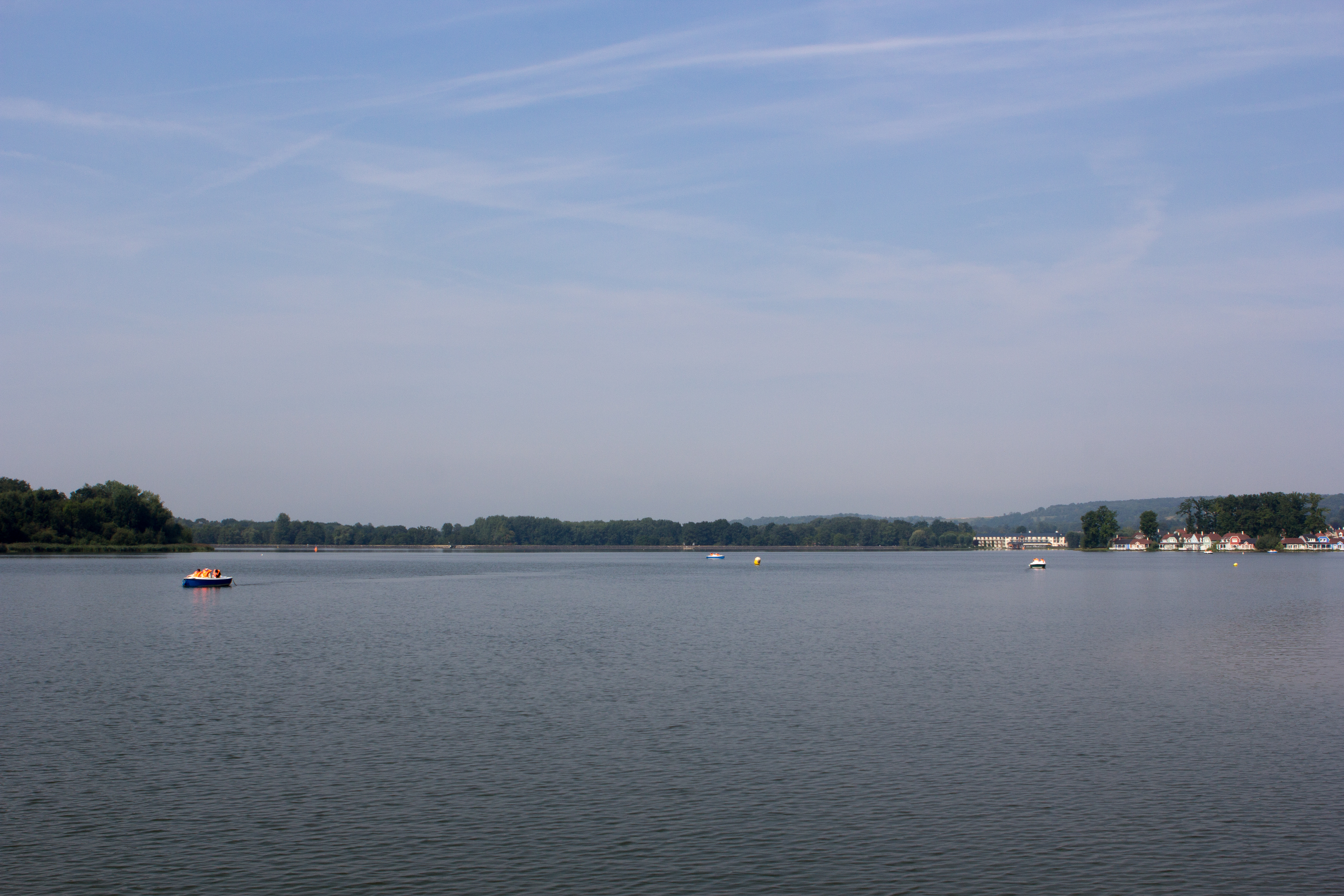
- Center Parcs, Lac d'Ailette area, Chamouile, Aisne, France

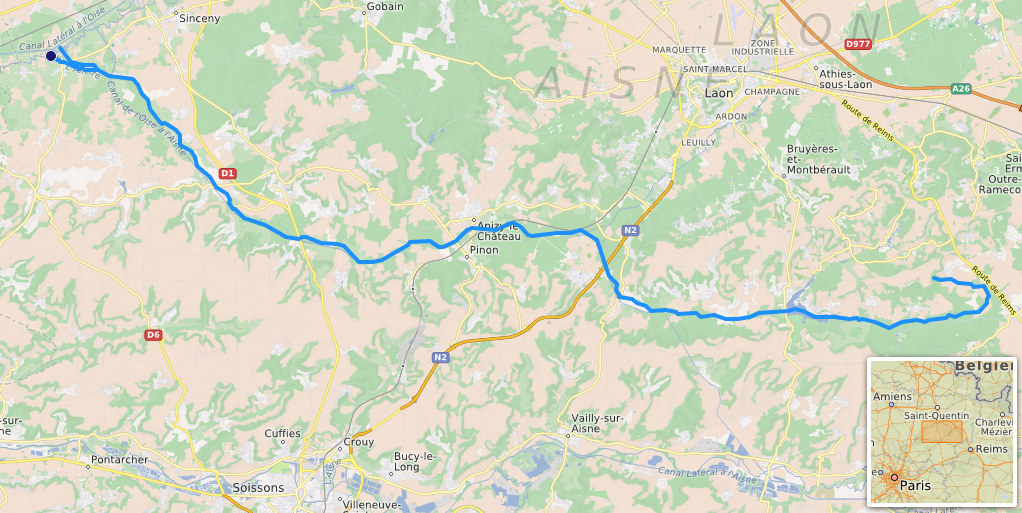

Location
- Country: France

Physical characteristics
- Source
  - location: Sainte-Croix
  - coordinates: 49°29′11″N 03°46′37″E
  - elevation: 110 m (360 ft)
- Mouth
  - location: Oise
  - coordinates: 49°34′40″N 03°09′41″E
  - elevation: 40 m (130 ft)
- Length: 59.5 km (37.0 mi)
- Basin size: 540 km^{2} (210 sq mi)
- Discharge
  - average: 3 m^{3}/s (110 cu ft/s)

Basin features
- Progression: Oise→ Seine→ English Channel

The Ailette (French pronunciation: [ɛlɛt]) is a 59.5 km (37.0 mi) long river in the Aisne department in eastern France. Its source is at Sainte-Croix. It flows generally west-northwest. It is a left tributary of the Oise into which it flows between Manicamp and Quierzy, 30 km (19 mi) northeast of Compiègne.

On most of its course, it shares its valley with the Canal de l'Oise à l'Aisne.

== Communes along its course ==
This list is ordered from source to mouth:

- Aisne: Sainte-Croix, Corbeny, Craonne, Bouconville-Vauclair, Chermizy-Ailles, Neuville-sur-Ailette, Cerny-en-Laonnois, Chamouille, Pancy-Courtecon, Colligis-Crandelain, Trucy, Chevregny, Monampteuil, Pargny-et-Filain, Urcel, Chavignon, Royaucourt-et-Chailvet, Chaillevois, Merlieux-et-Fouquerolles, Vaudesson, Pinon, Lizy, Anizy-le-Château, Vauxaillon, Landricourt, Leuilly-sous-Coucy, Jumencourt, Crécy-au-Mont, Coucy-le-Château-Auffrique, Pont-Saint-Mard, Guny, Champs, Trosly-Loire, Saint-Paul-aux-Bois, Pierremande, Bichancourt, Manicamp, Quierzy
