= Pargny-et-Filain =

- Commune
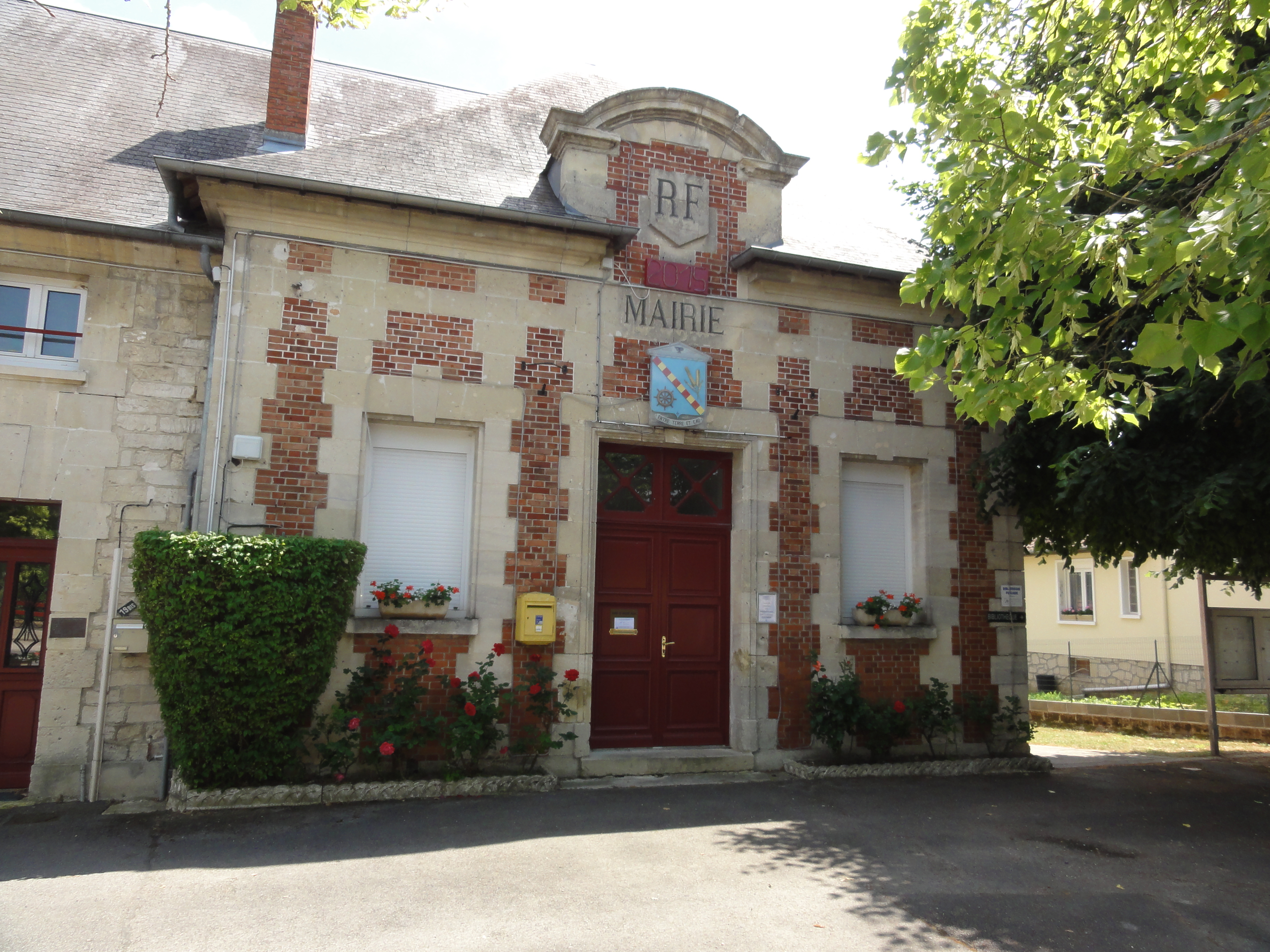
- Town hall
- Location of Pargny-et-Filain
- Location within France Location within Hauts-de-France
- Coordinates: 49°27′52″N 3°32′43″E
- Country: France
- Region: Hauts-de-France
- Department: Aisne
- Arrondissement: Soissons
- Canton: Fère-en-Tardenois
- Intercommunality: Val de l'Aisne

Government
  - Mayor (2026–32): Olivier Carlier
- Area^{1}: 9.79 km^{2} (3.78 sq mi)
- Elevation: 105 m (344 ft)
- Highest elevation: 192 m (630 ft)
- Lowest elevation: 62 m (203 ft)
- Population (2023): 367
  - Density: 37.5/km^{2} (97.1/sq mi)
- Time zone: UTC+01:00 (CET)
  - Summer (DST): UTC+02:00 (CEST)
- INSEE/Postal code: 02589 /02000
- ^{1} French Land Register data, which excludes lakes, ponds, glaciers > 1 km^{2} (0.386 sq mi or 247 acres) and river estuaries.

Pargny-et-Filain (French pronunciation: [paʁɲi e filɛ̃], lit. 'Pargny and Filain') is a commune in the Aisne department in northern France. It was formed on 1 January 2025, with the merger of Filain and Pargny-Filain.

== See also ==
- Communes of the Aisne department
