= Apsalos, Pella =

Apsalos
- Community
- Location within Greece
- Coordinates: 40°53′34″N 22°3′19″E
- Country: Greece
- Geographic region: Macedonia
- Administrative region: Central Macedonia
- Regional unit: Pella
- Municipality: Almopia
- Municipal unit: Aridaia

Population (2021)
  - Community: 919
- Time zone: UTC+2 (EET)
  - Summer (DST): UTC+3 (EEST)

Apsalos (Greek: Άψαλος, before 1926: Δραγουμάνιτσα – Dragoumanitsa) is a village in Pella regional unit, Macedonia, Greece.

== History ==
Apsalos had 1277 inhabitants in 1981. In fieldwork done by anthropologist Riki Van Boeschoten in late 1993, Apsalos was populated by a Greek population descended from Anatolian Greek refugees who arrived during the Greek–Turkish population exchange, and Vlachs. Pontic Greek was spoken in the village by people over 30 in public and private settings. Children understood the language, but mostly did not use it. The Vlach language was spoken in the village by people over 30 in public and private settings. Children understood the language, but mostly did not use it.
