= Paligrad =

- Village
- Палиград
- Location within North Macedonia
- Coordinates: 41°50′N 21°30′E
- Country: North Macedonia
- Region: Skopje
- Municipality: Zelenikovo

Population (2021)
  - Total: 12
- Time zone: UTC+1 (CET)
  - Summer (DST): UTC+2 (CEST)
- Car plates: SK
- Website: .

Paligrad (Macedonian: Палиград, Albanian: Paligrad) is a village in the municipality of Zelenikovo, North Macedonia.

== Demographics ==
As of the 2021 census, Paligrad had 12 residents with the following ethnic composition:

- Albanians 7
- Persons for whom data are taken from administrative sources 5

According to the 2002 census, the village had a total of 303 inhabitants. Ethnic groups in the village include:

- Albanians 302
- Bosniaks 1
