= Joseph Maurice Pambet =

French army general (1854–1916)

- Pambet as chef de bataillon of the 4th Zouaves in 1897
- Born: 13 March 1854; Commercy, Meuse
- Died: 6 January 1916 (aged 61); Plaisance, Dordogne
- Military career
- Allegiance: France
- Branch: French Army
- Service years: 1872–1916
- Rank: Général de division
- Conflicts: Occupation of Tunisia (1896-1905) First World War (1914-16): Battle of the Ardennes (1914); Battle of the Meuse (1914); First Battle of the Marne (1914); Battle of the Marshes of Saint-Gond (1914); First Battle of the Aisne (1914); First Battle of Picardy (1914)
- Awards: Chevalier of the Legion of Honour; Commander of the Order of Glory (Tunisia); Golden Palms of the Ordre des Palmes Académiques

Joseph Maurice Pambet (13 March 1854 – 6 January 1916) was a French army general. Volunteering for service in 1872 Pambet graduated from the Ecole Spéciale Militaire de Saint-Cyr and served with a number of line infantry and light infantry regiments, reaching the rank of captain by 1885. Having attended the École Militaire he became an adjutant to his regiment and then an aide to brigade and divisional generals. Returning to regimental service as a chef de bataillon Pambet began a nine-year tour of service in Tunisia from 1896.

Leaving Tunisia in 1905, Pambet gained his first command, that of an infantry regiment, before becoming military governor of Marseille. A number of brigade and regional commands followed before he was appointed commander of the 22nd Infantry Division and a général de division in 1912. Pambet held command of the 22nd Division at the outbreak of the First World War and led it into many of the early battles. After the division's poor performance at a river crossing during the First Battle of Picardy, however, Pambet was relieved of his command by General Foch for his "lack of impetus". Pambet was placed in reserve and made assistant to the commander of the 12th Military Region. It was in this capacity that he was acting when he was killed in a car accident at Plaisance, Dordogne on 6 January 1916.

== Early career ==
Joseph Maurice Pambet was born on 13 March 1854 to Pierre Eduard Elisa Pambet and Mathilde Baudot Pambet at Commercy, Meuse. His father worked for the land registry at Ligny-en-Barrois. Pambet volunteered for army service at the town hall in Langres on 15 November 1872, at the age of 18. Nine days later he was appointed a cadet at the Ecole Spéciale Militaire de Saint-Cyr. Pambet received promotion to senior cadet on 5 April 1874 and was commissioned as a sous lieutenant in the 10th Battalion of the Chasseurs à Pied on 1 October 1874, having ranked 122nd out of his class of 304 at the academy.

Pambet was promoted to lieutenant and transferred to the 113th Line Infantry Regiment on 11 November 1879. He subsequently transferred to the 3rd Line Infantry Regiment on 10 March 1883 and was promoted to captain in the 26th Battalion of the Chasseurs à Pied on 18 March 1885. He married Marie Emilie Comparet on 7 October 1885.

Pambet attended the École Militaire between 1 November 1886 and 11 November 1888, and ranked 30th in his class of 72. Returning to his battalion, he served as adjutant between 25 May 1888 and 30 November 1888, when he became aide to the general commanding the 58th Infantry Brigade. Pambet was transferred to the 111th Infantry Regiment on 7 March 1889, to the 140th Infantry Regiment on 24 January 1890 and back to the 111th on 22 March 1890. Seven days later, Pambet became aide to the general commanding the 29th Infantry Division.

Pambet was transferred to the 141st Infantry Regiment on 22 March 1893 and promoted to chef de bataillon in the 3rd Infantry Regiment on 24 December 1894, before transferring to the 4th Zouave Regiment on 30 December 1895. He served on campaign in Tunisia from 30 January 1896. Pambet was appointed a chevalier of the Legion of Honour on 29 December 1896. He was appointed to the staff of the Division of Occupation in Tunisia on 29 1897, a role he occupied when promoted to lieutenant-colonel on 3 November 1900. He became chief of staff of the division on 16 October 1901. Pambet was a commander of the Tunisian Order of Glory and held the golden palms of the Ordre des Palmes Académiques.

== First commands ==
Pambet was promoted to colonel and received his first command, that of the 13th Infantry Regiment, on 24 June 1905. He left Tunisia on 9 July that year. He was appointed to be simultaneously commander of the defences of Marseille, governor of Marseille and commander of the region of Marseille from 23 March 1909. He was promoted to général de brigade on 21 June 1909 and appointed an officier of the Legion of Honour on 12 July 1910.

On 29 November 1911 Pambet was appointed commander of the 18th Infantry Brigade, stationed at Blois, and simultaneously held command of the military region of Blois and Orléans. He assumed command of the 22nd Infantry Division and the regions of Lorient, Vannes, Brest and Quimper on 21 December 1912 and was promoted général de division on 31 October 1913.

== First World War ==
Upon the general mobilisation of French forces in August 1914 Pambet's division formed part of the 11th Military Region. Under his command the division moved through the Forest of Argonne to Croix-au-Bois near Grandpré, Ardennes. where it engaged the German forces at the Battle of the Ardennes on 22 August 1914.

Withdrawing to Sedan, Pambet and his division fought at the Battle of the Meuse and the First Battle of the Marne. They were also engaged in the Battle of the Marshes of Saint-Gond and the First Battle of the Aisne in September 1914. Moving to Albert, Somme, the division was immediately engaged in the First Battle of Picardy on 27 September 1914. Following the battle, on 29 September, General Foch relieved Pambet of his command due to his "lack of impetus". Foch made it clear that he had been trying to have Pambet removed from the 22nd Division for some time but that the time taken for the division to cross the River Aisne at Picardy had been the last straw.

Pambet was without a position in the French army (on the unattached list) from 30 September until 26 October, when he was placed on the reserve list of officers. He was appointed an assistant to the commander of the 12th Military Region, at Périgueux on 14 November. Pambet was killed on active service in a car accident at 3pm on 6 January 1916 at Plaisance, Dordogne.
