= 10th Cavalry Division (France) =

10th Division de Cavalerie
- Active: 1 September 1913 – 1 June 1916
- Country: France
- Branch: Army
- Type: Cavalry Division
- Role: Cavalry
- Engagements: First World War

Commanders
- Notable commanders: Louis Conneau

The 10th Cavalry Division was a French army unit that fought in World War I in 1914 and was disbanded, after a period of inaction, in 1916.

== History ==
=== 1914 ===
- Mobilized in the 12th, 17th, and 18th regions.
- 3 – 5 August: transported by railroad (V.F. or voie ferrée) to the Rosières-aux-Salines region.
- 5 – 17 August: deployed along the Sânon River.
- 17 – 20 August: reconnaissance toward Sarrebourg. On 20 August, engaged in the Battle of Sarrebourg.
- 20 – 26 August: fallback to Rozelieures, with combat on 24 and 25 August.
- 26 August – 3 September: withdrawal toward Nancy and regroup; from 1 September, transported by railroad to the area of Condé-en-Brie.
- 3 – 6 September: fallback on Provins.
- 6 – 14 September: engaged in the First Battle of the Marne, at the Battle of the Two Morins capturing Château-Thierry, and then pursuing the enemy, past Fismes and Pontavert, to the area around Sissonne.
- 14 – 17 September: withdrawal to the south of Aisne then advance toward Reims.
- 17 September – 22 October: advance toward Montdidier, fighting around Bapaume in the First Battle of Picardy, then in the Battle of Arras (fighting near Achiet-le-Grand on 28 September, Saint-Léger on 30 September, Pont-à-Vendin on 8 October, and Vermelles on 10 October), and then in the First Battle of Ypres (fighting near Merville on 15 October, Fleurbaix on 16 October, Radinghem on 18 and 21 October).
- 22 October – 1 November: retreated and regrouped in the Merville region, near Lillers.
- 1–11 November: fighting in Belgium, in the Battle of Messines.
- 11 November – 11 December: withdrawal after being relieved by the British army; from 15 November, transported east by railroad to the Charmes area for rest.
- 11 December 1914 – 5 January 1915: transported by railroad to the Rougemont-le-Château area with elements being employed near d'Aspach-le-Bas.

=== 1915–1916 ===
- 5 January – 20 August: with elements of the territorial army in sector between Leimbach and Burnhaupt-le-Haut.
- 20 August – 7 October: withdrawn and rested near Montreux-Vieux.
- 7 – 12 October: again with the territorial army between Leimbach and Burnhaupt-le-Haut.
- 12 October 1915 – 1 June 1916: again withdrawn and rested near Montreux-Vieux; elements employed in watching the Swiss border.
- 1 June 1916: disbanded.

=== Attachments ===
- Mobilisation: detached
- August 1914: Conneau Cavalry Corps
- August 1914: detached
- September 1914: Conneau Cavalry Corps
- September 1914: 1st Cavalry Corp
- November 1914: detached
- June 1916: disbanded

== Commanders ==
- General Conneau, 1 September 1913 – 15 August 1914
- General Grellet (interim), 15 August – 13 September 1914
- General de Contades-Gizeux, 13 September 1914

== Composition ==
=== Composition at formation ===
- 10th Brigade of Dragoons:
  - 15th Regiment of Dragoons
  - 20th Regiment of Dragoons
- 15th Brigade of Dragoons:
  - 10th Regiment of Dragoons
  - 19th Regiment of Dragoons
- Attached elements:
  - Infantry: 10th Cyclist Group of the First Battalion of Light Infantry
  - Artillery: 1 battery of 75mm guns, 14th Field Artillery Regiment

=== Composition in January 1915 ===
- 10th Brigade of Dragoons:
  - 15th Regiment of Dragoons
  - 20th Regiment of Dragoons
- 15th Brigade of Dragoons:
  - 10th Regiment of Dragoons
  - 19th Regiment of Dragoons
- Matuzinsky Brigade:
  - Marching (provisional) regiment of light cavalry
  - Marching (provisional) regiment of the 12th Regiment of Hussars
- Attached elements:
  - Infantry: 10th Cyclist Group of the 1st Battalion of Light Infantry
  - Artillery: 1 battery of 75s, 14th Field Artillery Regiment

=== Composition in July 1915 ===
- 10th Brigade of Dragoons:
  - 15th Regiment of Dragoons
  - 20th Regiment of Dragoons
- 15th Brigade of Dragoons:
  - 10th Regiment of Dragoons
  - 19th Regiment of Dragoons
- 23rd Light Brigade:
  - 22nd Regiment of Light Cavalry
  - 16th Regiment of Hussars
- Attached elements:
  - Infantry: 10th Cyclist Group of the 1st Battalion of Light Infantry
  - Artillery: 1 battery of 75s, 14th Field Artillery Regiment

=== Composition in May 1916 ===
- 10th Brigade of Dragoons:
  - 15th Regiment of Dragoons
  - 20th Regiment of Dragoons
- 15th Brigade of Dragoons:
  - 10th Regiment of Dragoons
  - 19th Regiment of Dragoons
- 1st Marching (Provisional) Brigade of African Light Cavalry:
  - 2nd Regiment of African Light Cavalry
  - 5th Regiment of African Light Cavalry
- Attached elements:
  - Infantry: 10th Cyclist Group of the 1st Battalion of Light Infantry
  - Artillery: 1 battery of 75s, 14th Field Artillery Regiment

== See also ==
- French Army in World War I

== Bibliography ==
- Les armées françaises dans la Grande guerre [French Armies in the Great War] (in French). Vol. Tome 10, Volume 2: Ordres de bataille des grandes unités : divisions d'infanterie, divisions de cavalerie [Orders of battle of large units: infantry divisions, cavalry divisions]. 1924. AFGG_10_2.
