= 23rd Dragoon Regiment (France) =

French cavalry unit created during the Ancien Regime and dissolved in 1928

- 23^{e} régiment de dragons
- Active: 1670–1814; 1873–1928
- Country: France
- Branch: French Army
- Type: Cavalry
- Size: Regiment
- Nickname: Royal Piémont
- Mottos: Noli irritare leonem (Do not irritate the lion)
- Engagements: French Revolutionary Wars; Napoleonic Wars; World War I
- Decorations: Croix de Guerre 1914–1918 with 1 palm

Commanders
- Notable commanders: Col. Paul de Bazelaire (1919)

The 23rd Dragoon Regiment (French: 23^{e} Régiment de dragons, 23^{e} RD) was a French cavalry unit created in 1670 in Turin as Prince-de-Piemont it was transferred to French service in 1671. It became Royal Piémont in 1690, 14^{e} Régiment de Cavalerie in 1791 and finally 23^{e} Régiment de Dragons in 1803. It was dissolved in 1928.

== History ==
The regiment was established in 1690 by the Kingdom of France as the Royal-Piémont. Before that it used to be a cavalry regiment established by the Duke of Savoy in 1670 as Prince-de-Piemont.

It became the 14th cavalry regiment in 1791 during Napoleon First Empire then was named 23rd Dragoon Regiment on 24 September 1803. It was disbanded on 14 May 1814 with the end of the Empire before being reactivated on 29 September 1873. In 1900 it was based in Vincennes.

The regiment served as horse cavalry during the First World War before being finally disbanded in 1928.

== Combat ==
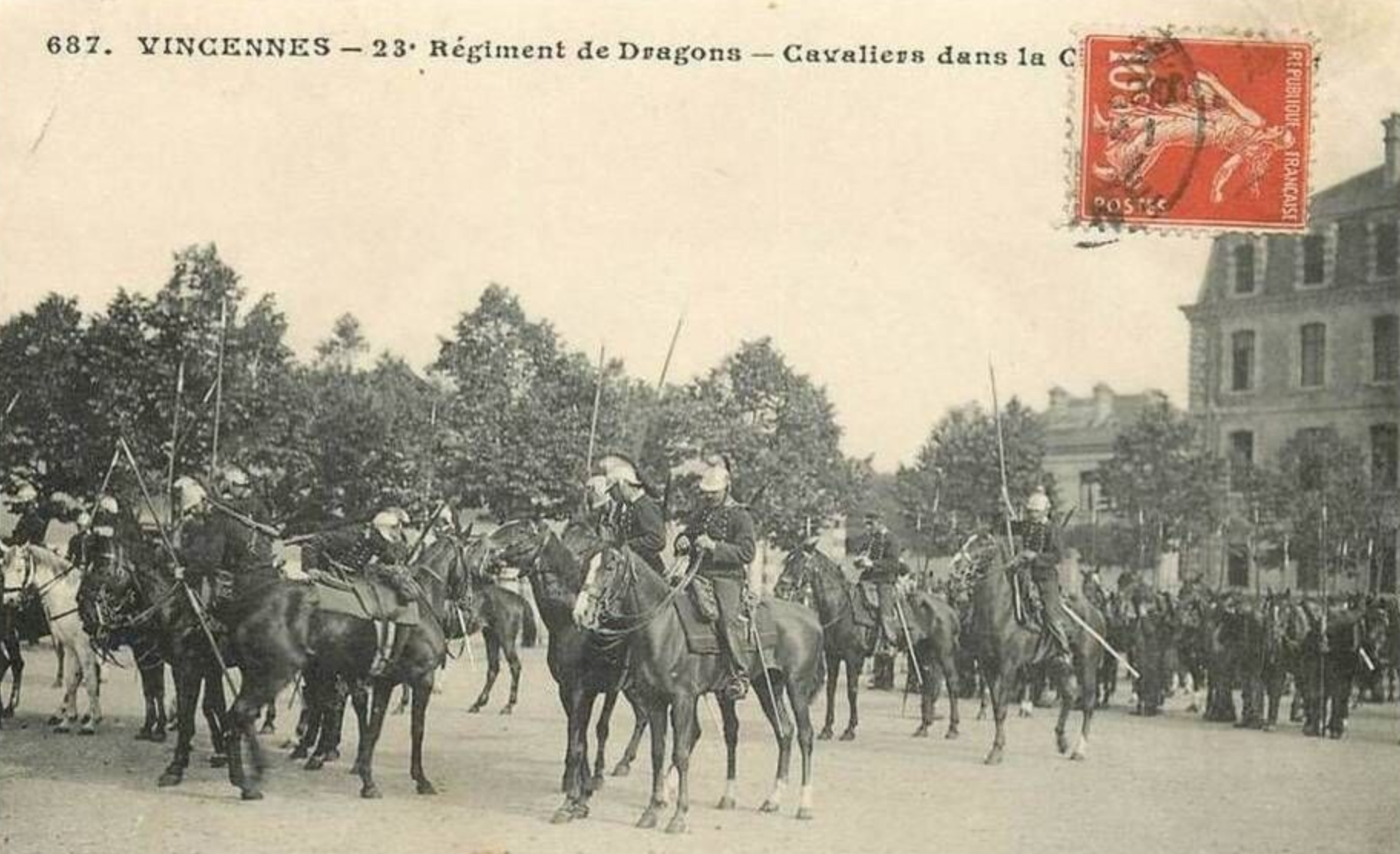
Riders in the courtyard, Vincennes. c.1914

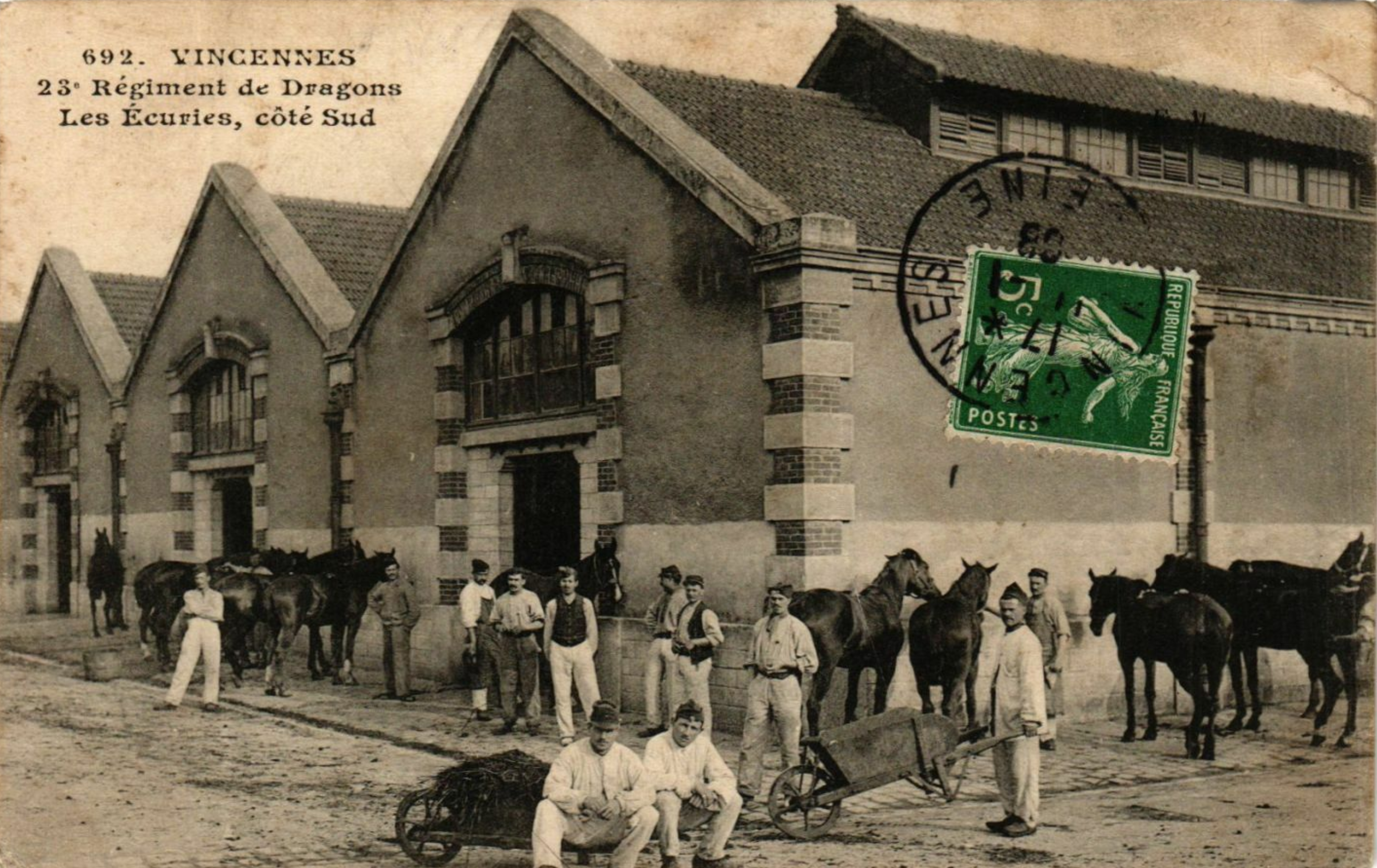
The stables, south side, Vincennes

Notable involvements from 1672 to 1918:

=== French Kingdom ===
- Franco-Dutch War
- Nine Years' War
- War of the Spanish Succession
- War of the Polish Succession
- War of the Austrian Succession
- Seven Years' War

=== French First Republic ===
- Siege of Mainz
- Italian campaigns

=== French Empire ===
- Battle of Caldiero
- Battle of Wagram
- Battle of Borodino
- Battle of Dresden
- Battle of Leipzig
- Battle of Vauchamps

=== First World War ===
- First Battle of Picardy
- Second Battle of the Marne

== Banner ==
It bears, sewed in golden letters in its layers, the following inscriptions:

- Mayence 1793
- Caldiero 1805
- Wagram 1809
- La Moskova 1812
- Dresde 1813
- Picardie 1914
- Champagne 1918

== Decorations ==
Its tie is decorated:

- With the Croix de Guerre 1939–1945, with 1 palm.
- Fourragère, with the colours of the Croix de Guerre ribbon, 1914–1918.

== Sources ==
- France. Ministère de la guerre (1900). Historiques des corps de troupe de l'armee française (1569-1900) (in French). Berger-Levrault & cie.
- Andolenko, S. (1968). Recueil d'historiques de l'arme blindée et de la cavalerie (in French). Eurimprim.
- Susane, L. (1874). Histoire de la cavalerie française (in French). J. Hetzel et Cie.
- Journal de marche du 23e Régiment de Dragons pendant la Campagne 1914-1918
