= Crafty (disambiguation) =

Crafty is a chess program. Crafty or Crafties may also refer to:

- Crafty Games, an American publisher of role-playing games
- HMS Crafty, a later name of HMS Renard (1803), a Royal Navy schooner
- Crafties, students of Guitar Craft
- Crafty, mascot of Bristol-Plymouth Regional Technical School, East Taunton, Massachusetts, United States
- Crafty (illustrator) (1840 –1906), French equestrian illustrator born Victor Eugène Géruzez
- Craft service workers of the film industry
