= Henri Conneau =

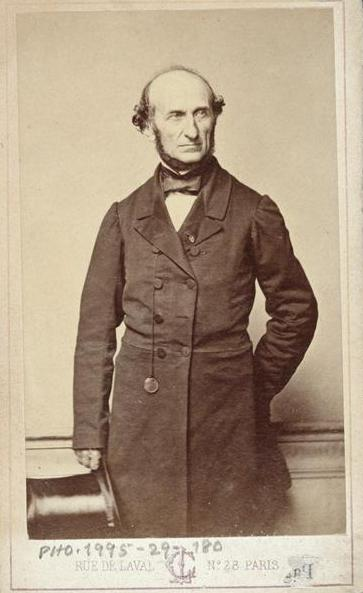
Photographic portrait of Doctor Conneau in 1867 by Léon Crémière

François-Alexandre-Henri Conneau (1803–1877) or Doctor Conneau (Docteur), was a French senator, surgeon and loyal attendant of Napoleon III. He was also the father of general Louis Conneau.
