= Gudmar Olovson =

Swedish scultor and artist (1936 - 2017)

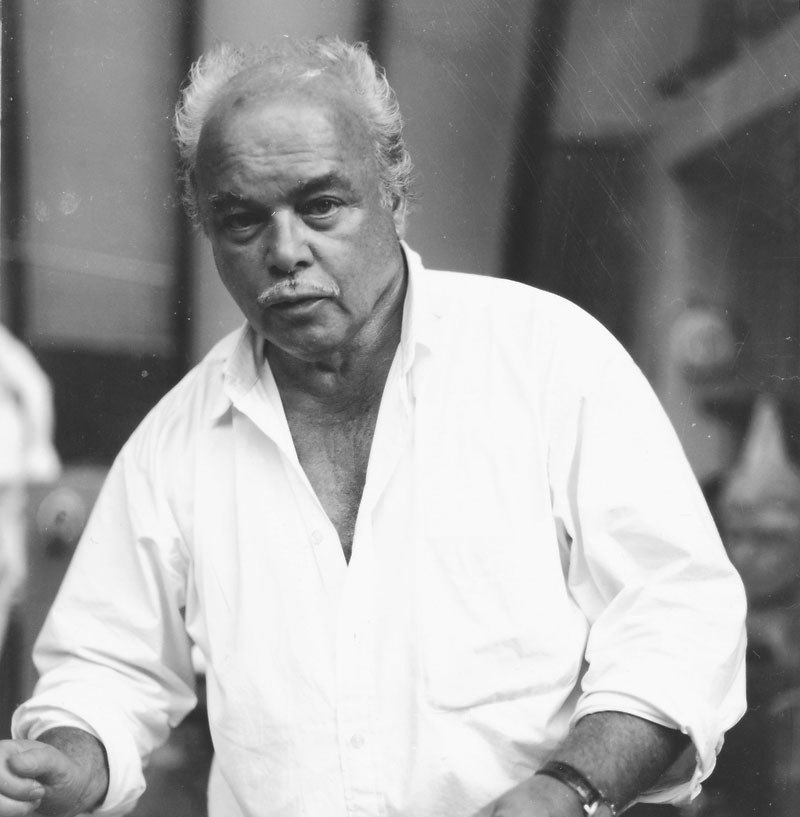
Gudmar Olovson

Gudmar Olovson (1 March 1936 – 17 April 2017) was a Swedish sculptor, artist, engraver and lithographer.

== Life and work ==
He was the son of surgeon Thore Olovson and Lis-Marit Ouchterlony-Olovson and had two younger sisters, Lis-Thoril Olovson and Rajna Olovson.

After studying at the Royal Swedish Academy of Fine Arts in Stockholm 1955–59, Olovson visited Florence and Rome before settling in Paris where he first occupied a studio in La Cité Universitaire thanks to a scholarship. From 1959 onwards he remained in Paris, renting studios in the 14th and 15th arrondissements, with the last being located at 64 rue Saint Charles.

Olovson found his initial inspiration in the works of François Rude, Jean-Baptiste Carpeaux, Carl Milles, and Auguste Rodin. He developed his personal style alongside his newfound mentors, sculptors Jean Carton, Gunnar Nilsson, Jean Ousouf and Paul Cornet. He exhibited, befriended and worked closely with them and other figurative non-academic sculptors of his generation such as Charles Auffret and René Babin, all with strong connections to the “Groupe des Neuf”, created in 1963 to defend and promote figurative sculpture.

Olovson let human passions and the beauty of nature inspire and invigorate his work and produced over 200 original sculpture artworks and a large collection of lithographs, etchings and drawings up until his death in 2017. He participated in a large number of exhibitions in France, Sweden, USA and elsewhere. He signed all his works simply with “Gudmar”.

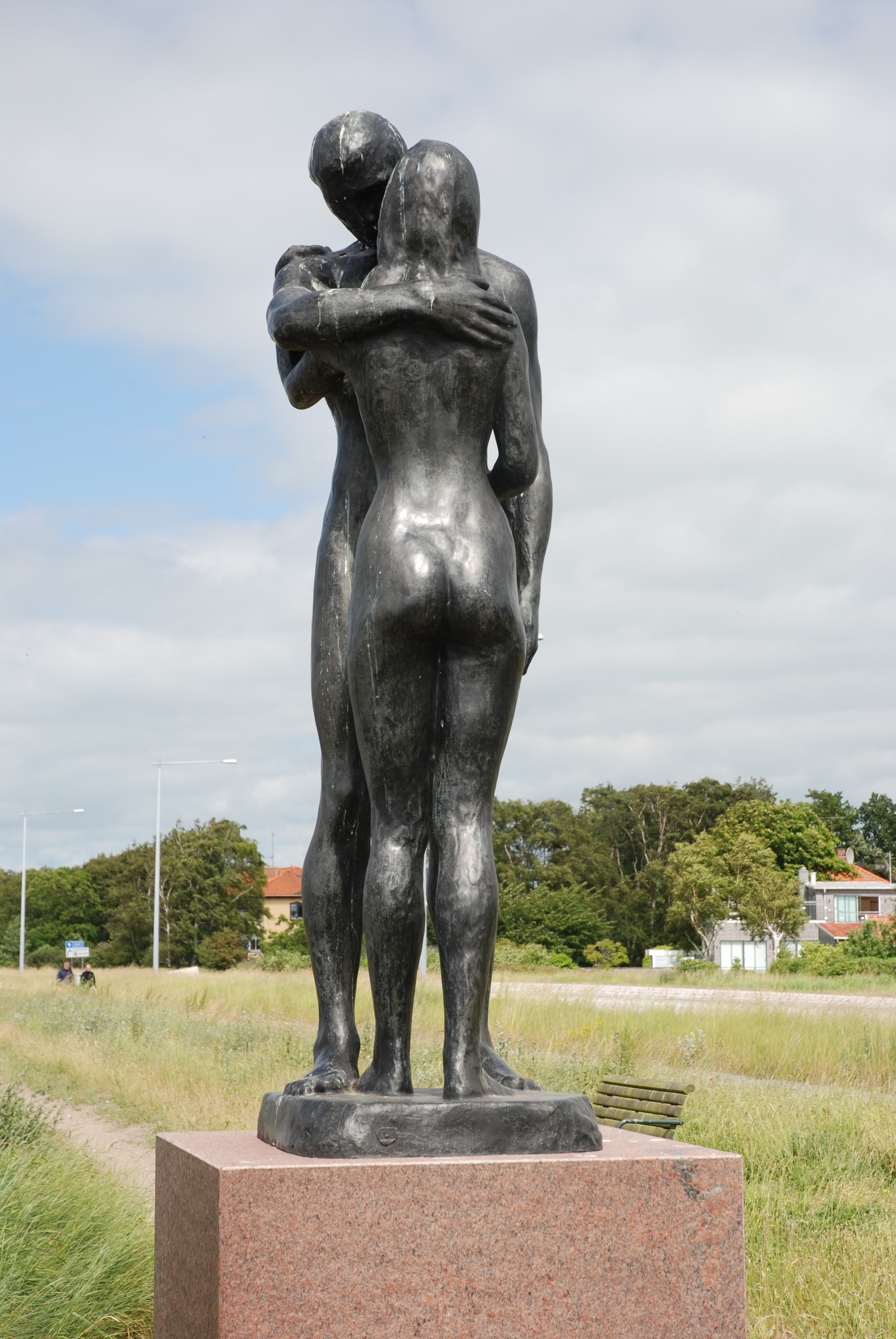
Olovson's Les deux arbres, Falsterbonäs Open Air Museum, Höllviken, Vellinge, Sweden

Arguably Olovson's most acclaimed piece, “Les Deux Arbres” stands 2.4 metres tall in Paris’ Bois de Boulogne on the island in its Lac Supérieur – a gift from Swedish industry to the city of Paris in 2001. A similar sized “Les Deux Arbres” adorns the park of Château Petrus in Pommerol.

Höllvikens Open Air Museum on the southwestern coast of Sweden features five monumental bronze sculptures by Olovson (“La Concorde”, “Les Deux Arbres”, “Prelude”, “Les Deux Soeurs”, “Femme-Oiseau Blessé”).

The French Mediterranean city of Cagnes-sur-Mer hosts another two monumental bronzes, “J’aime les Nuages” and “La Concorde” on its sea-side promenade.

Olovson was commissioned for sculpted portraits in bronze of over 90 personalities including H.M. King Carl XVI Gustaf of Sweden, H.R.H. Crown Princess Victoria of Sweden, Pope Johannes Paulus II, French presidents Charles de Gaulle, Georges Pompidou and Jacques Chirac, wine legend Baron Philippe de Rothschild, Swedish industrialists and businessmen Jakob Wallenberg, Peter Wallenberg, Peder Wallenberg-Sager, Jonas af Jochnick, Adolf Lundin and Bo Hjelt.

In 1964 in Paris Olovson was commissioned to complete a bronze portrait of Swedish actress Ingrid Bergman. A marble version of the portrait can be found at the Royal Dramatic Theater of Stockholm.

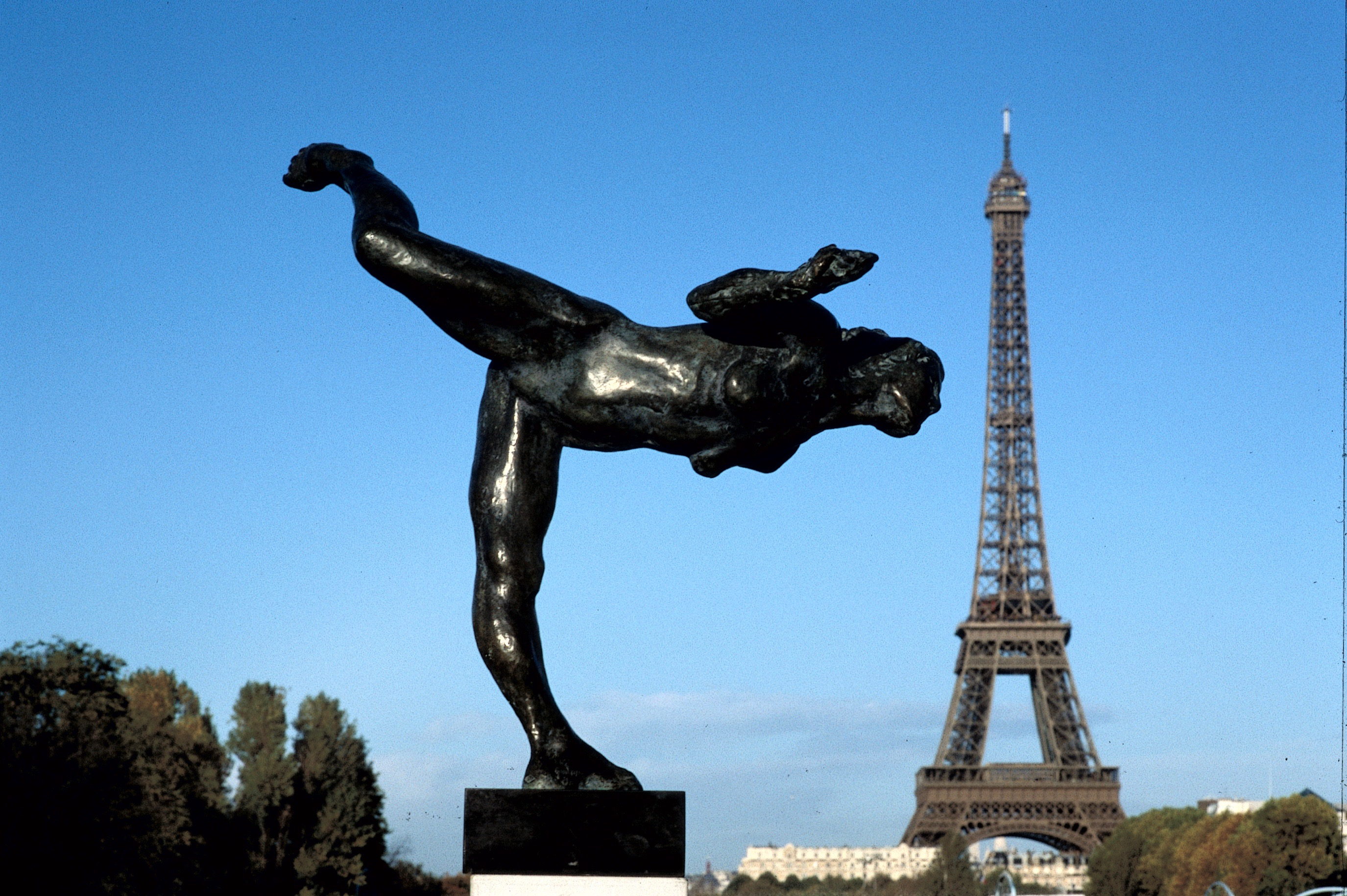
La Concorde - 1969 Bronze - Lost wax Attilio Valsuani - 1974 - Private Collection Paris

In November 2016 Olovson gave two talks in Swedish at the National Museum of Finland, Helsinki and Humanisticum, Turku, about his life and sculpting with the title “Mitt liv i sculpture”.

In 2019 six of Olovson's bronze sculptures were exhibited in the Garden of Love at Château de Cheverny in the Loire Valley in France.

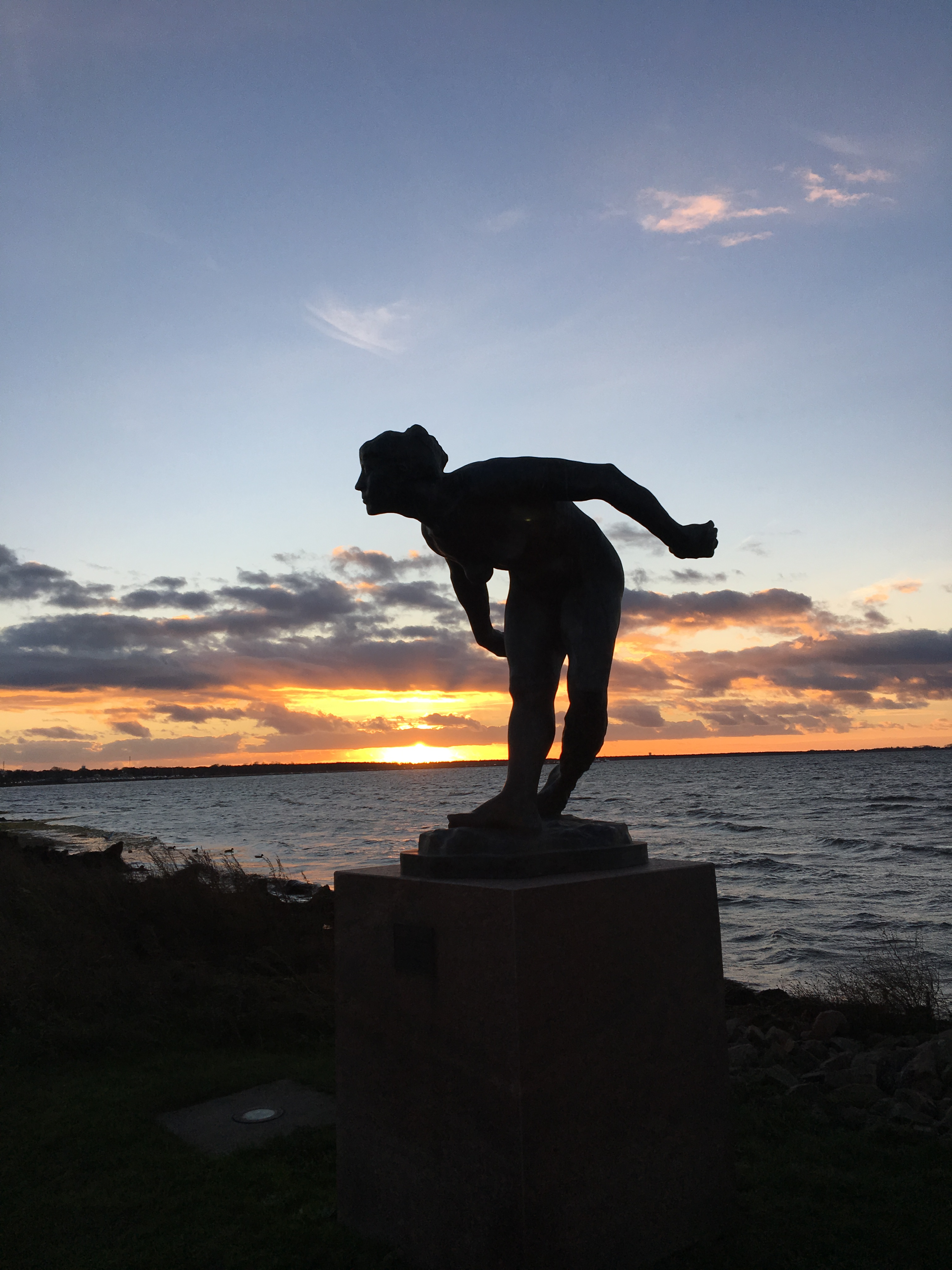
Skadad fågel - Olovson, Skulptur vid Höllviken Falsterbonäset Open Air Museum, Sweden

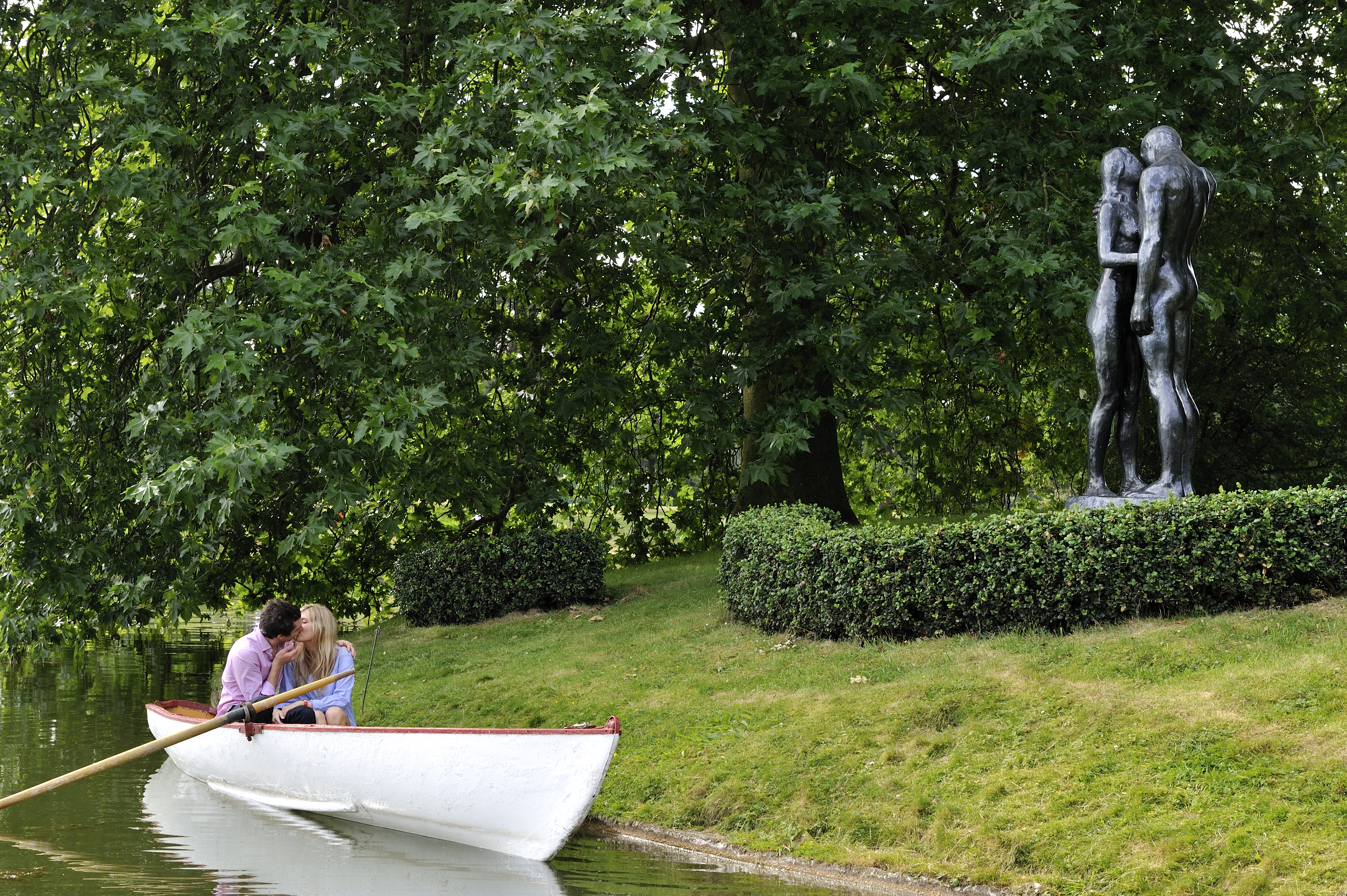
Les Deux Arbres - H.240cm Bronze Lost wax founder Emile Godard - Bois de Boulogne Paris

Olovson was married (1964-1982) to Birgitta Holmberg. They had two children. Magnus Olovson (born 1965) and Susanne Olovson (born 1970).

== Publications ==
- Gudmar Olovson – Sculptor by Harald Friberg & Patrice Dubois
