= Count Alphonse de Toulouse-Lautrec Montfa =

French nobleman (1838–1913)

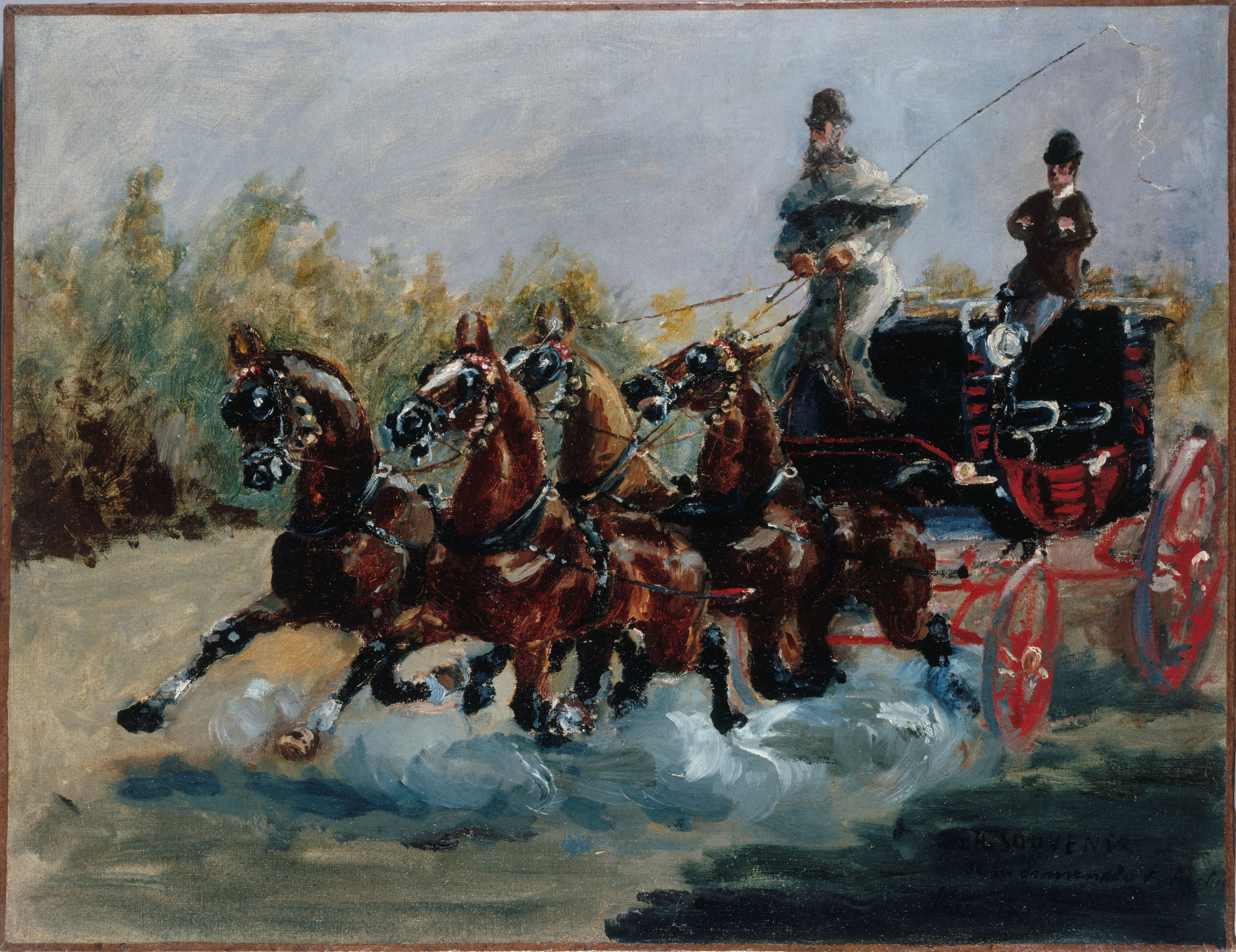
Count Alphonse de Toulouse-Lautrec Driving His Mail-Coach (1881).

Comte Alphonse de Toulouse-Lautrec Montfa (1838–1913) was a French aristocrat. A noted eccentric and fancier of horses, hawks, hunting, and kites, he was a "man out of time", whose vast wealth and royal connections allowed him to ignore convention.

Once, the count appeared uninvited at a parade in Paris, riding in a Norwegian cart pulled by a Welsh pony, while flying a French war-kite. When the parade officer protested, the enraged count challenged him to a duel. Both men fired their weapons and missed. Another time, he rode a mare in milk to the Cascade at the end of the Bois de Boulogne, milked the horse, and drank the milk for breakfast. He gave his pet hawks and cormorants holy water in the hope that they would go to heaven.

He held little regard for his son Henri, who became a famous painter and poster artist, but could not ride a horse.

== Life ==
Born in Albi on 10 August 1838, Alphonse de Toulouse-Lautrec Montfa was the son of Count Raymond (the Black Prince) and Gabrielle du Bosc. "Brilliant but impulsive", the boy was fond of hunting. A gifted student, he passed his exams and entered the military officer school at Saint-Cyr. At the academy, he became known for his independence, frivolity, and evasion of discipline. Count Alphonse married his first cousin Adèle, and they had two sons, Henri in 1864, and Richard in 1867.
