= Paul Cornet =

French visual artist, teacher (1892–1977)

- Born: 18 March 1892; Paris, France
- Died: c. 10 April 1977; Saint-Martin-de-Nigelles, Centre-Val de Loire, France
- Education: École nationale supérieure des arts décoratifs
- Occupations: Visual artist, teacher
- Known for: Sculpture
- Spouse: Elna Lübschitz (m. 1919–)
- Father: Alphonse Cornet

Paul Cornet (18 March 1892 – 10 April 1977) was a French sculptor, painter, and teacher. He was known for his statues, nudes sculptures, busts, and monuments. He taught at the Académie Scandinave in Paris for many years.

== Early life, and education ==
Paul Cornet was born on 18 March 1892, in Paris, France, the son of genre painter Alphonse Cornet (1839–1898). He studied at the École nationale supérieure des arts décoratifs in Paris, as well as under sculptor Camille Debert.

He married in November 1919, Elna Lübschitz, the daughter of the Danish painter John Lübschitz (1858–1941).

== Career ==
Cornet was a teacher at the Académie Scandinave (English: Scandinavian Academy) a private art school in Paris, from 1929 to 1935.

He initially worked in a cubist style on his sculptures, and drew inspiration from Egyptian sculpture. Later he worked in a more realism style.

From 1954 to 1955, Cornet worked on the Tulle Memorial, a monument dedicated to the memory of the victims of World War II in Tulle in Nouvelle-Aquitaine, France. Starting in 1964, Cornet exhibited with the le Groupe des Neuf (the Group of Nine) at the Galerie Vendôme in Paris, of which group he was one of the co-founders a year earlier. Cornet sculpted a large number of monumental portraits (Campagne) for the Palais de Chaillot in Paris, as well as a sculpture (La Vienne) for the Champ de Juillet in Limoges, (Hygieia) for the Sèvres manufacture in Luxeuil-les-Bains, (Venus and Cupid) for the Orangerie in Meudon in Île-de-France, and a bronze (Tour d'Auvergne) for the Panthéon in Paris.

Cornet was recognized for his work and awarded the Wildenstein prize in 1967, and Paul-Louis Weiller prize in 1972.

== Death and legacy ==
Cornet died on either the 10th or 15th of April 1977, in Saint-Martin-de-Nigelles in Centre-Val de Loire, France.

His work can be found in museum collections, including Stedelijk Museum Amsterdam, and Museum Boijmans Van Beuningen.
