= Nicolas Eugène Géruzez =

French critic (1799–1865)

Nicolas Eugène Géruzez (6 January 1799 – 29 May 1865), was a French critic.

He was born at Reims. He was assistant professor at the Sorbonne, and in 1852 he became secretary to the faculty of literature. His works include a Histoire de l'éloquence politique et religieuse en France aux XIV', XV' et XVI' siècles (1837-1838); an Histoire de la littérature française depuis les origines jusqu’a la Revolution (1852), which he supplemented in 1859 by a volume bringing down the history to the close of the revolutionary period; and some miscellaneous works.

Géruzez died in Paris. A posthumous volume of Mélanges et pensées appeared in 1877.

His son, Victor Eugène Géruzez (known as "Crafty") was an equestrian illustrator.
