= Count Alphonse de Toulouse-Lautrec Driving His Mail-Coach =

Painting by Henri de Toulouse-Lautrec

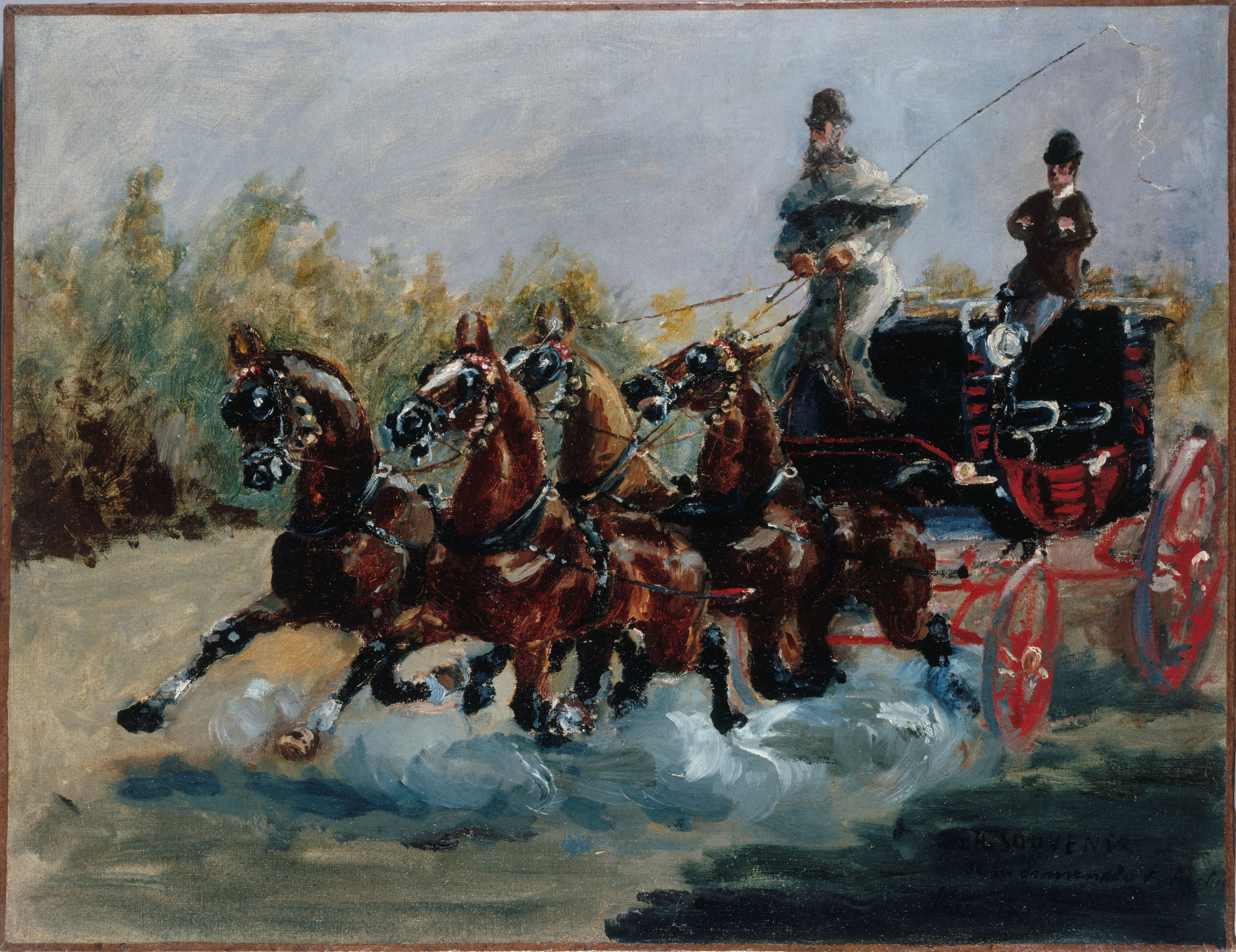
- Artist: Henri de Toulouse-Lautrec
- Year: 1881
- Medium: oil on canvas
- Dimensions: 60 cm × 71 cm (24 in × 28 in)
- Location: Petit Palais; Paris

Count Alphonse de Toulouse-Lautrec Driving His Mail-Coach is a painting by Henri de Toulouse-Lautrec of his father, a great lover of horses, completed in 1881 when Toulouse-Lautrec was 17 years old. It is now in the Petit Palais in Paris.

The work is highly influenced by equestrian scenes by Crafty and by British and American engravings of horse-teams. It is signed in the bottom right-hand corner "HTL, Souvenir de la Promenade des Anglais". The painter stayed on the Côte d'Azur several times due to his bad health and was inspired by Nice.
