= Crafty (illustrator) =

French comic writer and illustrator (1840–1906)

- Born: Victor Eugène Géruzez; 24 May 1840; Paris, France
- Died: 26 May 1906 (aged 66); Saint-Martin-de-Nigelles, France
- Known for: Equine illustration

Crafty, real name Victor Eugène Géruzez (24 May 1840 in Paris – 26 May 1906 in Saint-Martin-de-Nigelles) was a French comic writer and illustrator, specialising in books about horses and hunting on horseback.

== Biography ==
He was the son of Nicolas Eugène Géruzez and Désirée-Antoinette Sales. He was married on 7 March 1874 in Paris, to Louise Marguerite Gabrielle Vavin, the daughter of Alexis Vavin. They had two children, Claire Hélène and Jean Pierre Eugène.

He studied under Charles Gleyre, and exhibited at the Salon de Paris from 1877.

His drawings were first published in Le Centaure, a review established by Léon Crémière, who also published his first two books, Snob à Paris and Snob à l'exposition ("Snob at the Paris Exposition").

He was a contributor to several reviews, newspapers and periodicals including Le Journal Amusant, La Vie Parisienne, L'Éclipse, Graphic, L’Esprit Follet, and Le Journal Pour Rire.

He provided many of the illustrations for Les Chats by Champfleury (1870) and Enfants by Alphonse Daudet (1873). He also illustrated a book by his brother Paul.

Originals of his work are highly sought.

== Works ==
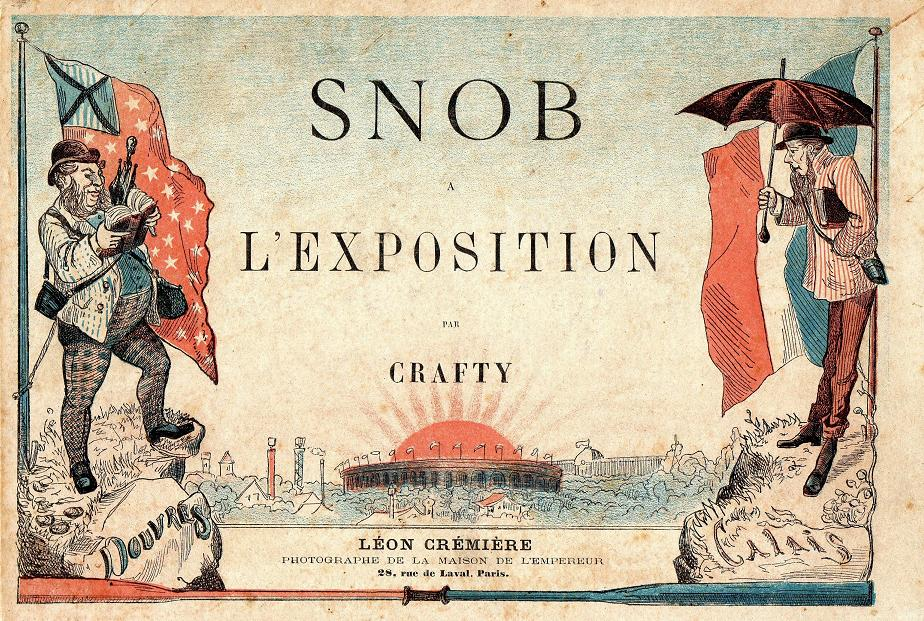
Snob à l’Exposition

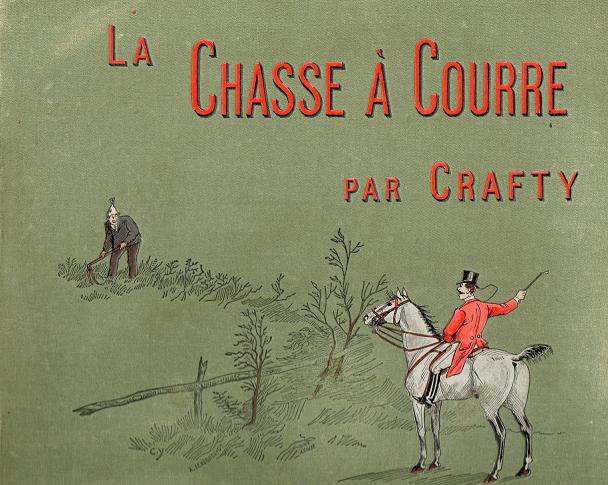
Chasse à courre ("Hunting on Horseback")

- Snob à Paris (in French). Paris: Léon Crémière. 1866.
- Snob à l'Exposition (in French). Paris: Léon Crémière. 1867.
- Paris à cheval, texte et dessins par Crafty [Paris on Horseback] (PDF) (in French). Paris: E. Plon et Cie. 1883., with a preface by Gustave Droz
- La Province à cheval, texte et dessins, par Crafty [Provence on Horseback] (PDF) (in French). Paris: Librairie Plon, E. Plon, Nourrit et Cie. 1885.
- Crafty (1886). L'Équitation puérile et honnête, petit traité à la plume et au pinceau [Equestrianism pure and simple] (in French). Paris: E. Plon, Nourrit et Cie.
- Crafty (1887). La Chasse à tir, notes et croquis [Hunting on Horseback] (in French).
- La Chasse à courre, notes et croquis [The Hunt, notes and sketches]. Paris: E. Plon, Nourrit et Cie. 1888.
- Album Crafty. Les Chiens [Crafty Omnibus. Dogs] (in French). 1890.
- Album Crafty. Croquis parisiens. Les Chevaux [Crafty Ombinbus. Parisian Sketches. Horses] (in French). Paris: E. Plon, Nourrit et Cie. 1891.
- Paris au Bois, texte et croquis [Paris woodland] (in French). Paris: E. Plon et Cie. 1890.
- Album Crafty. Quadrupèdes et bipèdes [Crafty Omnibus. Quadrupeds and Bipeds] (in French). 1893.
- À travers Paris, texte et dessins [Around Paris] (PDF) (in French). Paris: Librairie Plon, E. Plon, Nourrit et Cie. 1894.
- Anciens et nouveaux sports. Paris sportif, texte et dessins par Crafty [Sports Ancient and Modern. Sporting Paris] (in French). Paris: Librairie Plon, E. Plon, Nourrit et Cie. 1896.
- Sur le Turf, texte et dessins, par Crafty. Courses plates et steeple-chases [On Turf. Flat and steeplechase racing.] (PDF) (in French). Paris: E. Plon, Nourrit et Cie. 1899.
- Album Crafty. Croquis parisiens (below)
- le Comte de Comminges, Captain of the 15th Horse (1901). Dressage et menage [Dressage and maintenance] (in French). Paris: Plon-Nourrit et Cie. Illustrated by Crafty.

== Sources ==
- Schurr, Gérard (1989). Les Petits Maîtres de la peinture 1820–1920 : valeur de demain [Minor masters of painting 1820–1920: Tomorrow's value] (in French). Vol. VII. Paris: Les Éditions de l'Amateur.
- Bénézit (1999). Dictionnaire critique et documentaire des peintres, sculpteurs, dessinateurs et graveurs [Critical and Reference Dictionary of Painters, Sculptors, Artists and Engravers] (in French). Paris: GRÜND.
