= Léon Crémière =

French photographer

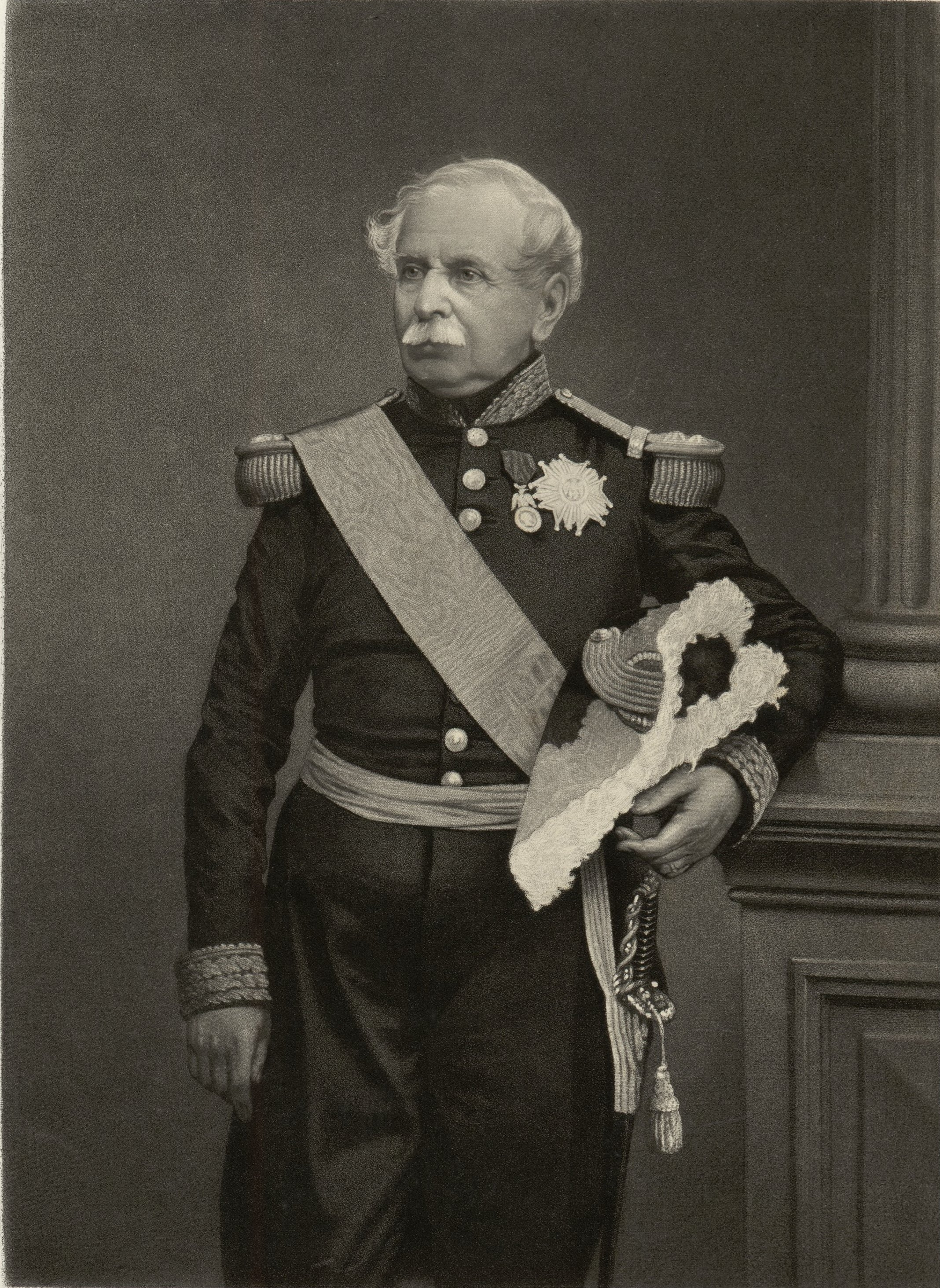
- Portrait of Jacques Louis Randon by Léon Crémière
- Born: 7 February 1831
- Died: 1913

Léon Crémière (7 February 1831 in Paris – 1913), was a French photographer. He made numerous portraits of military men, and of animals.

== Life ==
Léon Crémière started as an assistant to André-Adolphe-Eugène Disdéri, before opening his own studio in Paris in 1862, specialising in the photography of hunting dogs and horses.

Working from his studio at 28 Rue Laval, he became the house photographer and publisher for Napoleon III in 1866. He used the pen-name "de Lazare".

He published photographic collections, and in 1866 founded Le Centaure, a weekly illustrated magazine of sport, hunting, farming and arts, which was published until 1868. The published etchings were created from photographs. The illustrator Crafty published several drawings, and his first two collections Snob à Paris and Snob à l'Exposition were published by Crémière in 1866 and 1867.

In 1882, he became editor of Le Chenil, a newspaper published by Lemercier. The same year, he published the Stud Book Continental (SBC), which was superseded in 1885 by the Livre des origines français ("Book of French Pedigrees") of the Société Centrale Canine.

== Publications ==
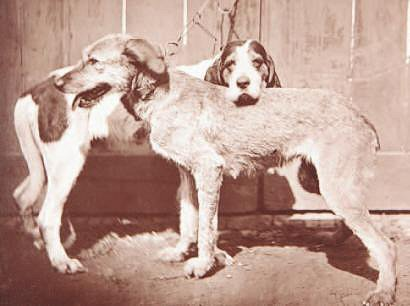
Chiens de chasse ("Hunting dogs"), 1880

- La Vénerie française, à l'exposition de 1865 [French Hunting, at the 1865 Exhibition] (in French). Paris: J. Rothschild. 1865. With an introduction by Jean-Emmanuel Le Couteulx de Canteleu
- Album du centaure, chevaux [Centaure Horse Collection] (in French). 1866.
- Stud Book Continental des races canines (SBC). 1882.
- Le Chenil illustré. Types des races canines avec notices extraites des meilleurs ouvrages [Types of canine breeds with records taken from the best works] (in French). Didot et Cie. 1885.
- Crémière, L.; Hanfstaeng, F. Album du Prince Impérial, armée française [Collection of the Imperial Prince, French Army] (in French). Paris.
