= Camille Debert =

French sculptor

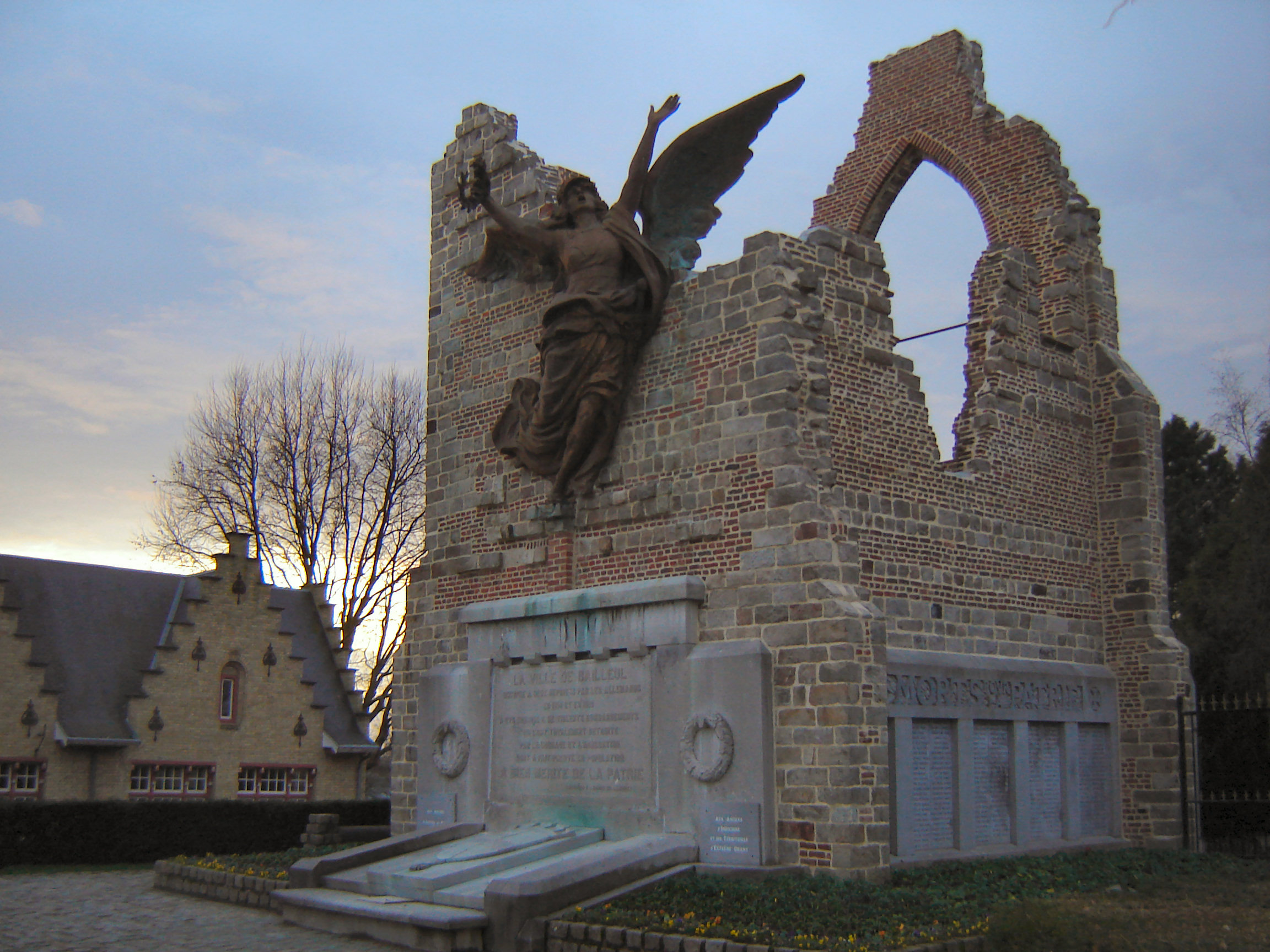
"The monument aux morts" at Bailleul.

Camille Charles Jules Debert (April 15, 1866 – September 29, 1935) was a French sculptor.

Debert was born in Bailleul, Nord, in 1866, the son of Charles Debert, a master sculptor who had a studio in the rue de Lille. Early studies in Bailleul and Bruges were followed by a period at the École des Beaux-Arts in Lille and finally Paris. Military service in 1891 saw him posted to Nancy, a centre for the arts, and there in the army barracks he was commissioned to create a statue of Turenne. Once he had completed his military service, he returned to Paris and worked in the studio of Jules Cavelier. With his cousin Constant Sonneville, an architect, he entered a competition to design a monument dedicated to the French soldiers killed at Antwerp in 1832, and they won it and were given the commission. However, the city of Antwerp refused to erect the monument, which now stands in Tournai. At the young age of 27, Debert was recognised by the Salon des Artistes Francais and executed a statue entitled "À la source". In the early 20th century he was based in his studio at 4, rue Franquet, Paris, and from there, with a team of assistants, he worked in wood, marble, bronze and stone. Among his work was a bust of General Cheroutre, who had been Governor of Corsica and was buried in Bailleul's cemetery. For the town of Meteren he sculpted the bust of Pierre De Coninck in 1911 and that of Commandant Clemmer. For the Bishop of Moulins he created a medallion for his funeral plaque in Bergues. Debert is regarded above all as a religious sculptor and one of his most celebrated works is his relief carving of a Flemish peasant woman at prayer. This work in bronze was entitled "En Flandres". Debert also worked on the creation of church altars, tympani and other church furnishings for churches in and around Bailleul. As with so many sculptors after the end of the Great War in 1918, Debert found himself working on numerous monument aux morts and some of these are described below.

== War memorials ==
Work	Location	Notes and references
"Le Monument Francais"	Tournai, Belgium	This monument is dedicated to those French soldiers killed fighting in Antwerp in 1832. A tall column has at the top a female figure who holds aloft a palm, the symbol of peace and reconciliation. Around the base are bas-reliefs by Debert which show scenes from Antwerp's siege including soldiers preparing to fire cannons and French officers in discussion with Maréchal Gerard. The monument bears the coat of arms of Tournai. The inauguration ceremony took place on 19 September 1897.
Méteren Monument aux morts	Méteren, Nord	At the close of the war in 1918 Méteren lay in ruins. It was located near to the front-line and had been occupied for most of the four years of war by the British but had fallen into German hands on 9 April 1918 during the Battle of the Lys although it was retaken by the Allies on 19 July 1918. Debert carried out the sculptural work on the Méteren monument aux morts. A few steps lead up to the base of the memorial which consists of a low wall in the centre of which is a pedestal. Affixed to this pedestal is a bronze high relief by Debert. A woman in Flemish dress kneels before a soldier's grave. There is a cross on the grave, this carrying the French National flag, and a carving of a small piece of an oak tree lies at the base of the cross; the oak an emblem of glory. In the upper part of the relief a soldier is seen clutching and defending the flag and Debert no doubt meant this to be the scene that the woman was visualising as she looked down on the grave. In her mind she would see the dead soldier in some heroic act. The memorial remembers a total of 117 men. All these men died in one of the two World Wars save for one who was killed fighting in Indo-China. Their names are inscribed on the wall and on either side of the central pedestal.
Bailleul Monument aux morts.	Bailleul, Nord	It was the architect Jacques Barbotin who had the imaginative idea of using the bricks from the Bailleul church of Saint Amand, destroyed in 1918 along with its belfry, to build a false ruined wall to which Debert's bronze "Angel of Victory" is affixed. Also on this wall are the names of the many men of Bailleul "Morts pour la Patrie". A photograph of Debert's dramatic work is shown above.
Crosne Monument aux morts	Crosne, Essonne	Debert executed this memorial in 1921.
"Pro Deo pro Patria"		This piece by Debert was produced and marketed by Compagnie Industrielle de Decoration Artistiques in Paris. It can be seen in many parish churches. i.e. Notre-Dame-des-Batignoles in Paris, Achères and the church of Saint-Géraud in Aurillac in the Cantal.

== Other works ==
Work	Location	Notes and references
The parish church of St Maurice de Bécon	Courbevoie, Hauts-de-Seine	There are two reliefs by Debert on the church's exterior. One is a depiction of Christ on the cross and the second depicts the head of St Maurice, complete with Roman helmet. Inside the church are two major works by Debert. One is of the Virgin Mary with Child and the other is of St Joseph also with the Infant Jesus. These works date to 1911.
The parish church of St Marie des Fontenelles	Nanterre, Hauts-de-Seine	There is a 1912 Debert sculpture of the "Virgin Mary with Child" in a niche above the church's porch.
The church of St Julien	Domfront, Orne	For the various side chapels of this church, Debert carved the Virgin Mary, St Thérese and St Joseph all carrying the Infant Jesus.
The church of St Vaast	Bailleul, Nord	This church was built in 1932 by Architects Louis-Marie Cordonnier and Louis Stanislas Cordonnier and Debert sculpted the four evangelists in the church's interior and carved other furnishings in the church.
The church of St Amand	Bailleul, Nord	Debert worked on several furnishings for this church. The old church had been destroyed in 1918 (see reference to Bailleul War Memorial above). The replacement church was built in 1932 and stands in the rue de la gare.
Statue of St Catherine Labouré	Moutiers-Saint-Jean, Côte-d'Or	For this old hospital Debert executed a painted plaster statue of St Catherine Labouré. Seems this one of a series where Debert created the original and this was replicated and sold by the organisation "La Statue Religieuse".
Chapelle Conventuelle	Saint-Brieuc, Cotes-d'Armor	For this establishment Debert sculpted the figure of Dom Leuduger.
The Church of St Nicholas	Blois, Loir-et-Cher	For this church Debert executed a statue of Jeanne d’Arc in 1929.
