= Plaisance, Dordogne =

Plaisance
- Commune
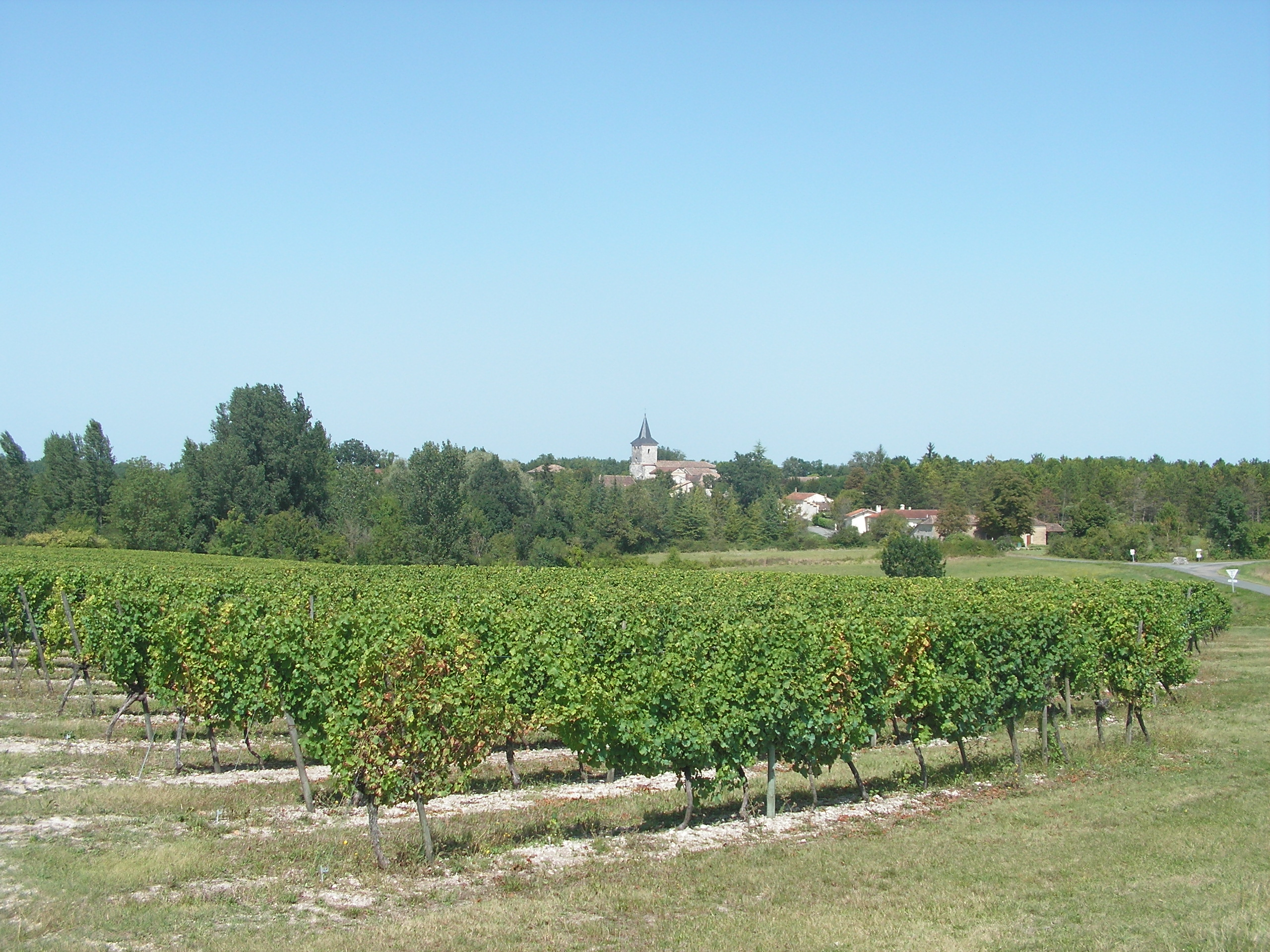
- A general view of Eyrenville in Plaisance
- Location of Plaisance
- Location within France Location within Nouvelle-Aquitaine
- Coordinates: 44°42′21″N 0°33′48″E
- Country: France
- Region: Nouvelle-Aquitaine
- Department: Dordogne
- Arrondissement: Bergerac
- Canton: Sud-Bergeracois

Government
  - Mayor (2020–2026): Christine Chapotard
- Area^{1}: 24.75 km^{2} (9.56 sq mi)
- Elevation: 86 m (282 ft)
- Highest elevation: 157 m (515 ft)
- Lowest elevation: 57 m (187 ft)
- Population (2023): 412
  - Density: 16.6/km^{2} (43.1/sq mi)
- Time zone: UTC+01:00 (CET)
  - Summer (DST): UTC+02:00 (CEST)
- INSEE/Postal code: 24168 /24560
- ^{1} French Land Register data, which excludes lakes, ponds, glaciers > 1 km^{2} (0.386 sq mi or 247 acres) and river estuaries.

Plaisance (French pronunciation: [plɛzɑ̃s]; Occitan: Plasença) is a commune in Dordogne, a department in Nouvelle-Aquitaine in southwestern France. It was created in 1973 by the merger of three former communes: Madacou, Eyrenville and Falgueyrat.

== Population ==
Historical population
Year	Pop.	±% p.a.
1968	477	—
1975	421	−1.77%
1982	406	−0.52%
1990	392	−0.44%
1999	410	+0.50%
2007	471	+1.75%
2012	440	−1.35%
2017	423	−0.78%
2023	412	−0.44%
Source: INSEE

== See also ==
- Communes of the Dordogne department
