= 22nd Infantry Division (France) =

The 22nd Infantry Division (French: 22e Division d'Infanterie, 22e DI) was a French Army formation during World War I and World War II.

== World War 1 ==
During World War I, the division was composed of the 19th, 62nd and 118th Infantry Regiments, the 116th Infantry Regiment (to November 1917), and the 7th Territorial Infantry Regiment (from August 1918). It was originally part of the French 11th Corps (CA).

The division fought in the following battles: the Battle of the Ardennes, the Battle of Meuse, the First Battle of the Marne, the First Battle of the Aisne, the Second Battle of Champagne, the Battle of Verdun, the Second Battle of the Aisne, the Third Battle of the Aisne and the Meuse-Argonne Offensive.

At various times, it was part of the French Second Army, French Third Army, French Fourth Army, French Fifth Army, French Sixth Army, French Seventh Army and French Ninth Army.

== World War 2 ==
During the Battle of France in May 1940 the division was made up of the following units:

- 19 Infantry Regiment
- 62 Infantry Regiment
- 116 Infantry Regiment
- 24 Reconnaissance Battalion
- 18 Artillery Regiment
- 218 Artillery Regiment

It was a Series A reserve division which contained younger reservists.
