= Antoine Gustave Droz =

French writer (1832–1895)

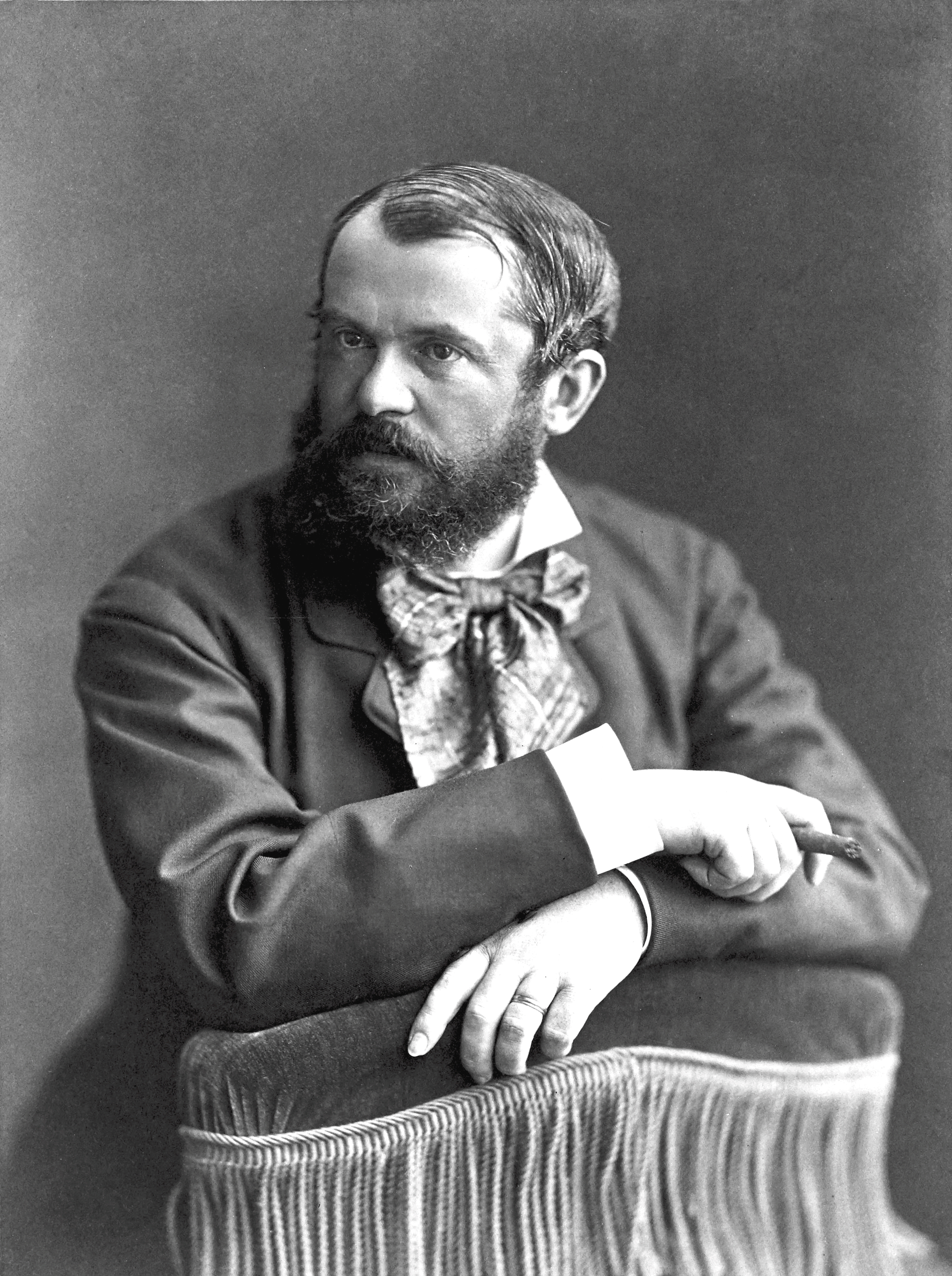
Antoine Gustave Droz

Antoine Gustave Droz (June 9, 1832 – October 22, 1895), author, French man of letters and son of the sculptor Jules-Antoine Droz (1807–1872), was born in Paris.

He was educated as an artist, and began to exhibit his work in Paris at the Salon of 1857. A series of sketch stories dealing gaily with the intimacies of family life, published in the magazine La Vie Parisienne and issued in book form as Monsieur, Madame et Bébé (1866), won for the author an immediate and great success. The publication Entre Nous (1867) was similar, and was followed by some psychological novels: Le Cahier Bleu de Mlle Cibot (1868); Autour d'une Source (1869); Un Paquet de Lettres (1870); Babolain (1872); Les Étangs (1875); Une Femme Gênante (1875); and L'Enfant (1885). His Tristesses et Sourires (1884) is a delicate analysis of the niceties of family intercourse and its difficulties. Droz's first book was translated into English with the title Papa, Mamma and Baby (1887).

"Gustave Droz saw love within marriage as the key to human happiness..." "He urged women to follow their hearts and marry a man nearly their own age."

A husband who is stately and a little bald is all right, but a young husband who loves you and drinks out of your glass without ceremony is better. Let him, if he ruffles your dress a little and places a kiss on your neck as he passes. Let him, if he undresses you after the ball, laughing like a fool. You have fine spiritual qualities, it is true, but your little body is not bad either and when one loves, one loves completely. Behind these follies lies happiness

— Droz

Quoted in T. Zeldin, France 1848–1945, vol. 1 (Oxford: Clarendon Press, 1973), p. 295.

== Notes ==
Gustave Dore wrote "Monsieur-Madame & Bebe, with illustrations by Edmond Morin, first published 1878 by Victor Havard, Paris.
