= Saint-Martin-de-Nigelles =

- Commune
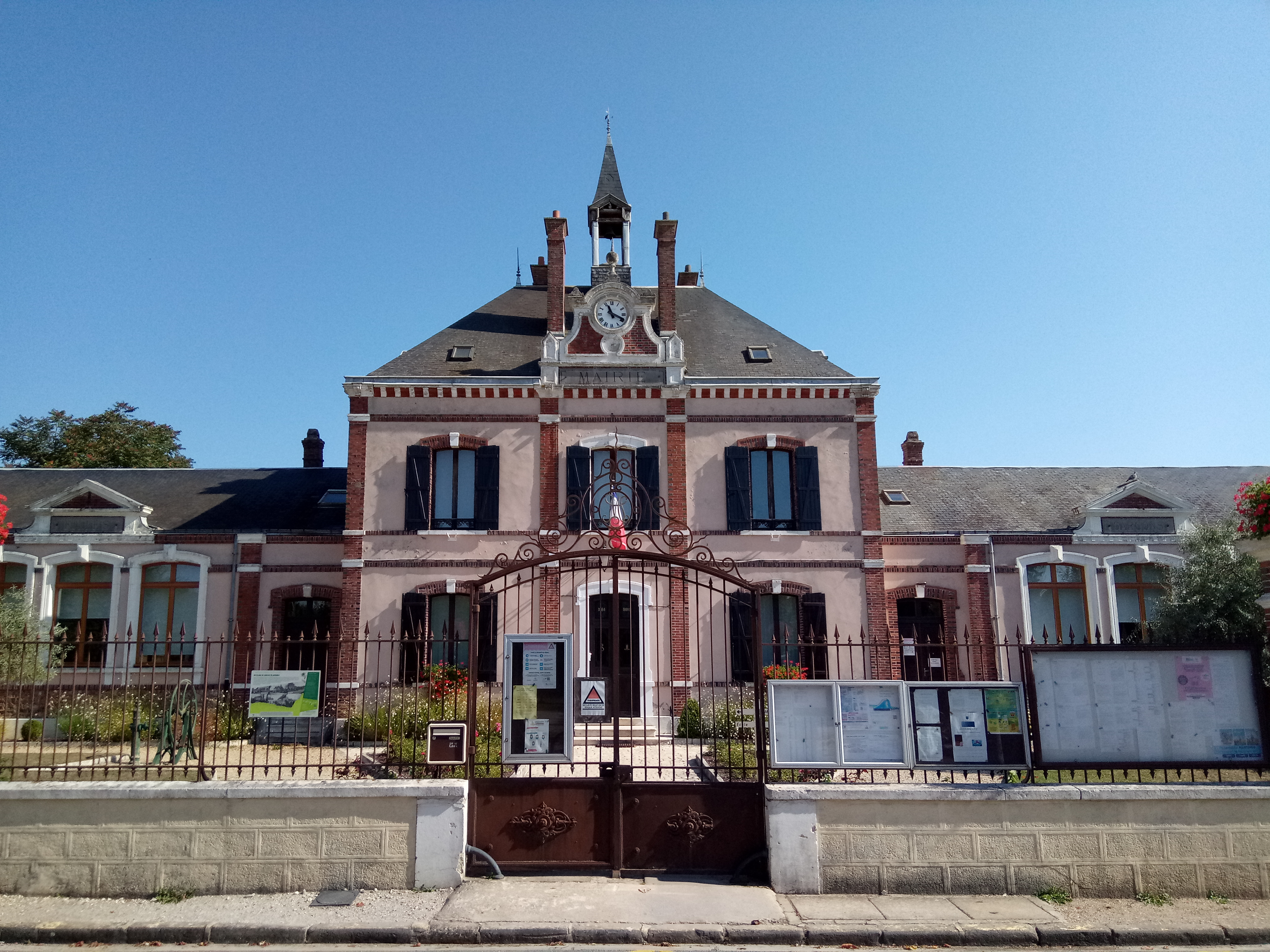
- The town hall in Saint-Martin-de-Nigelles

- Coat of arms
- Location of Saint-Martin-de-Nigelles
- Location within France Location within Centre-Val de Loire
- Coordinates: 48°36′41″N 1°36′42″E
- Country: France
- Region: Centre-Val de Loire
- Department: Eure-et-Loir
- Arrondissement: Chartres
- Canton: Épernon
- Intercommunality: Portes Euréliennes d'Île-de-France

Government
  - Mayor (2023–2026): Thierry Cordelle
- Area^{1}: 12.31 km^{2} (4.75 sq mi)
- Elevation: 108 m (354 ft)
- Highest elevation: 159 m (522 ft)
- Lowest elevation: 100 m (330 ft)
- Population (2023): 1,587
  - Density: 128.9/km^{2} (333.9/sq mi)
- Time zone: UTC+01:00 (CET)
  - Summer (DST): UTC+02:00 (CEST)
- INSEE/Postal code: 28352 /28130
- ^{1} French Land Register data, which excludes lakes, ponds, glaciers > 1 km^{2} (0.386 sq mi or 247 acres) and river estuaries.

Saint-Martin-de-Nigelles (French pronunciation: [sɛ̃ maʁtɛ̃ də niʒɛl]) is a commune in the Eure-et-Loir department in northern France.

== Population ==
Historical population
| Year | Pop. | ±% p.a. |
|---|---|---|
| 1968 | 363 | — |
| 1975 | 619 | +7.92% |
| 1982 | 944 | +6.21% |
| 1990 | 1,029 | +1.08% |
| 1999 | 1,147 | +1.21% |
| 2007 | 1,565 | +3.96% |
| 2012 | 1,589 | +0.30% |
| 2017 | 1,560 | −0.37% |
| 2023 | 1,587 | +0.29% |
Source: INSEE

== See also ==
- Communes of the Eure-et-Loir department
