= Pontavert =

- Commune
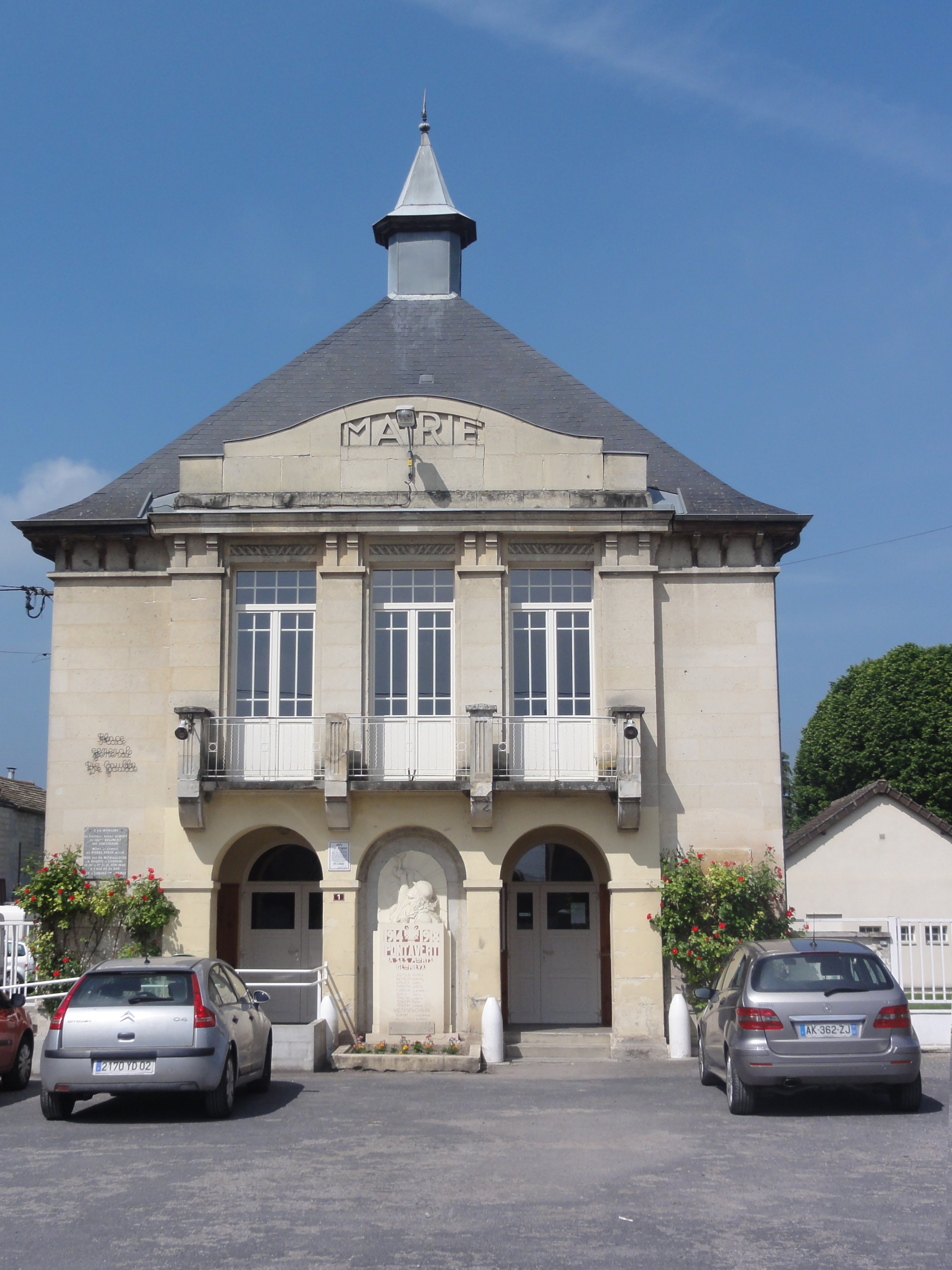
- Town hall
- Location of Pontavert
- Location within France Location within Hauts-de-France
- Coordinates: 49°24′28″N 3°49′15″E
- Country: France
- Region: Hauts-de-France
- Department: Aisne
- Arrondissement: Laon
- Canton: Villeneuve-sur-Aisne
- Intercommunality: Champagne Picarde

Government
  - Mayor (2026–32): Carmen Pollet
- Area^{1}: 13.37 km^{2} (5.16 sq mi)
- Elevation: 53 m (174 ft)
- Highest elevation: 120 m (390 ft)
- Lowest elevation: 47 m (154 ft)
- Population (2023): 605
  - Density: 45.3/km^{2} (117/sq mi)
- Time zone: UTC+01:00 (CET)
  - Summer (DST): UTC+02:00 (CEST)
- INSEE/Postal code: 02613 /02160
- ^{1} French Land Register data, which excludes lakes, ponds, glaciers > 1 km^{2} (0.386 sq mi or 247 acres) and river estuaries.

Pontavert (French pronunciation: [pɔ̃tavɛʁ]) is a commune in the Aisne department in Hauts-de-France in northern France.

== Population ==
Historical population
Year	Pop.	±% p.a.
1968	268	—
1975	282	+0.73%
1982	296	+0.69%
1990	416	+4.35%
1999	444	+0.73%
2007	608	+4.01%
2012	590	−0.60%
2017	610	+0.67%
2023	605	−0.14%
Source: INSEE

== See also ==
- Communes of the Aisne department
- List of medieval bridges in France
